

542001–542100 

|-bgcolor=#d6d6d6
| 542001 ||  || — || April 20, 2012 || Haleakala || Pan-STARRS ||  || align=right | 3.6 km || 
|-id=002 bgcolor=#d6d6d6
| 542002 ||  || — || October 8, 2008 || Catalina || CSS ||  || align=right | 3.0 km || 
|-id=003 bgcolor=#E9E9E9
| 542003 ||  || — || April 15, 2012 || Haleakala || Pan-STARRS ||  || align=right | 1.2 km || 
|-id=004 bgcolor=#E9E9E9
| 542004 ||  || — || May 25, 2003 || Kitt Peak || Spacewatch ||  || align=right | 2.7 km || 
|-id=005 bgcolor=#d6d6d6
| 542005 ||  || — || October 27, 2008 || Kitt Peak || Spacewatch ||  || align=right | 3.4 km || 
|-id=006 bgcolor=#d6d6d6
| 542006 ||  || — || April 21, 2012 || Kitt Peak || Spacewatch ||  || align=right | 3.5 km || 
|-id=007 bgcolor=#d6d6d6
| 542007 ||  || — || January 1, 2012 || Mount Lemmon || Mount Lemmon Survey ||  || align=right | 3.4 km || 
|-id=008 bgcolor=#d6d6d6
| 542008 ||  || — || January 31, 2011 || Bergisch Gladbach || Bergisch Gladbach Obs. ||  || align=right | 3.4 km || 
|-id=009 bgcolor=#d6d6d6
| 542009 ||  || — || April 21, 2012 || Haleakala || Pan-STARRS ||  || align=right | 2.5 km || 
|-id=010 bgcolor=#d6d6d6
| 542010 ||  || — || April 20, 2012 || Kitt Peak || Spacewatch ||  || align=right | 2.9 km || 
|-id=011 bgcolor=#d6d6d6
| 542011 ||  || — || December 28, 2005 || Kitt Peak || Spacewatch ||  || align=right | 2.4 km || 
|-id=012 bgcolor=#E9E9E9
| 542012 ||  || — || January 14, 2011 || Mount Lemmon || Mount Lemmon Survey ||  || align=right | 1.7 km || 
|-id=013 bgcolor=#fefefe
| 542013 ||  || — || August 27, 2006 || Kitt Peak || Spacewatch ||  || align=right data-sort-value="0.57" | 570 m || 
|-id=014 bgcolor=#d6d6d6
| 542014 ||  || — || April 20, 2012 || Kitt Peak || Spacewatch || THB || align=right | 2.8 km || 
|-id=015 bgcolor=#d6d6d6
| 542015 ||  || — || October 6, 2002 || Palomar || NEAT ||  || align=right | 5.0 km || 
|-id=016 bgcolor=#d6d6d6
| 542016 ||  || — || November 23, 2009 || Mount Lemmon || Mount Lemmon Survey ||  || align=right | 2.5 km || 
|-id=017 bgcolor=#d6d6d6
| 542017 ||  || — || April 25, 2007 || Mount Lemmon || Mount Lemmon Survey ||  || align=right | 2.4 km || 
|-id=018 bgcolor=#d6d6d6
| 542018 ||  || — || October 26, 2008 || Mount Lemmon || Mount Lemmon Survey ||  || align=right | 3.1 km || 
|-id=019 bgcolor=#d6d6d6
| 542019 ||  || — || April 20, 2012 || Kitt Peak || Spacewatch ||  || align=right | 2.5 km || 
|-id=020 bgcolor=#d6d6d6
| 542020 ||  || — || April 20, 2012 || Mount Lemmon || Mount Lemmon Survey ||  || align=right | 2.5 km || 
|-id=021 bgcolor=#d6d6d6
| 542021 ||  || — || April 11, 2007 || Mount Lemmon || Mount Lemmon Survey ||  || align=right | 2.7 km || 
|-id=022 bgcolor=#E9E9E9
| 542022 ||  || — || May 12, 2012 || Siding Spring || SSS ||  || align=right | 1.6 km || 
|-id=023 bgcolor=#d6d6d6
| 542023 ||  || — || May 12, 2012 || Mount Lemmon || Mount Lemmon Survey ||  || align=right | 2.5 km || 
|-id=024 bgcolor=#E9E9E9
| 542024 ||  || — || November 11, 2010 || Mount Lemmon || Mount Lemmon Survey ||  || align=right | 1.5 km || 
|-id=025 bgcolor=#d6d6d6
| 542025 ||  || — || September 3, 2008 || Kitt Peak || Spacewatch ||  || align=right | 2.2 km || 
|-id=026 bgcolor=#d6d6d6
| 542026 Kaszásattila ||  ||  || March 24, 2011 || Piszkesteto || K. Sárneczky, S. Kürti || EOS || align=right | 2.0 km || 
|-id=027 bgcolor=#d6d6d6
| 542027 ||  || — || May 1, 2012 || Siding Spring || SSS ||  || align=right | 2.9 km || 
|-id=028 bgcolor=#fefefe
| 542028 ||  || — || July 3, 2005 || Mount Lemmon || Mount Lemmon Survey ||  || align=right data-sort-value="0.78" | 780 m || 
|-id=029 bgcolor=#E9E9E9
| 542029 ||  || — || May 15, 2012 || Haleakala || Pan-STARRS ||  || align=right | 3.0 km || 
|-id=030 bgcolor=#d6d6d6
| 542030 ||  || — || October 30, 2008 || Kitt Peak || Spacewatch ||  || align=right | 3.2 km || 
|-id=031 bgcolor=#fefefe
| 542031 ||  || — || February 8, 2002 || Kitt Peak || R. Millis, M. W. Buie ||  || align=right data-sort-value="0.62" | 620 m || 
|-id=032 bgcolor=#d6d6d6
| 542032 ||  || — || October 29, 2008 || Mount Lemmon || Mount Lemmon Survey ||  || align=right | 3.8 km || 
|-id=033 bgcolor=#d6d6d6
| 542033 ||  || — || April 29, 2012 || Mount Lemmon || Mount Lemmon Survey ||  || align=right | 2.5 km || 
|-id=034 bgcolor=#E9E9E9
| 542034 ||  || — || May 14, 2012 || Kitt Peak || Spacewatch ||  || align=right | 1.8 km || 
|-id=035 bgcolor=#d6d6d6
| 542035 ||  || — || October 16, 2002 || Palomar || NEAT ||  || align=right | 3.3 km || 
|-id=036 bgcolor=#d6d6d6
| 542036 ||  || — || May 14, 2012 || Haleakala || Pan-STARRS ||  || align=right | 2.3 km || 
|-id=037 bgcolor=#d6d6d6
| 542037 ||  || — || May 12, 2012 || Mount Lemmon || Mount Lemmon Survey ||  || align=right | 2.3 km || 
|-id=038 bgcolor=#d6d6d6
| 542038 ||  || — || September 23, 2008 || Mount Lemmon || Mount Lemmon Survey ||  || align=right | 2.7 km || 
|-id=039 bgcolor=#d6d6d6
| 542039 ||  || — || October 27, 2008 || Mount Lemmon || Mount Lemmon Survey ||  || align=right | 3.6 km || 
|-id=040 bgcolor=#d6d6d6
| 542040 ||  || — || April 24, 2012 || Mount Lemmon || Mount Lemmon Survey ||  || align=right | 3.4 km || 
|-id=041 bgcolor=#d6d6d6
| 542041 ||  || — || May 15, 2012 || Haleakala || Pan-STARRS ||  || align=right | 3.0 km || 
|-id=042 bgcolor=#d6d6d6
| 542042 ||  || — || May 17, 2012 || Mount Lemmon || Mount Lemmon Survey ||  || align=right | 2.5 km || 
|-id=043 bgcolor=#d6d6d6
| 542043 ||  || — || May 17, 2012 || Mount Lemmon || Mount Lemmon Survey ||  || align=right | 1.8 km || 
|-id=044 bgcolor=#FA8072
| 542044 ||  || — || September 28, 2003 || Haleakala || AMOS ||  || align=right data-sort-value="0.57" | 570 m || 
|-id=045 bgcolor=#d6d6d6
| 542045 ||  || — || March 23, 2012 || Mount Lemmon || Mount Lemmon Survey ||  || align=right | 2.8 km || 
|-id=046 bgcolor=#d6d6d6
| 542046 ||  || — || December 29, 2003 || Kitt Peak || Spacewatch || Tj (2.97) || align=right | 4.7 km || 
|-id=047 bgcolor=#d6d6d6
| 542047 ||  || — || April 23, 2012 || Haleakala || Pan-STARRS ||  || align=right | 3.7 km || 
|-id=048 bgcolor=#d6d6d6
| 542048 ||  || — || May 15, 2012 || Haleakala || Pan-STARRS ||  || align=right | 2.4 km || 
|-id=049 bgcolor=#d6d6d6
| 542049 ||  || — || May 20, 2012 || Mount Lemmon || Mount Lemmon Survey ||  || align=right | 2.4 km || 
|-id=050 bgcolor=#d6d6d6
| 542050 ||  || — || January 13, 2011 || Kitt Peak || Spacewatch ||  || align=right | 3.7 km || 
|-id=051 bgcolor=#d6d6d6
| 542051 ||  || — || March 23, 2012 || Mount Lemmon || Mount Lemmon Survey ||  || align=right | 3.1 km || 
|-id=052 bgcolor=#E9E9E9
| 542052 ||  || — || May 17, 2012 || Mount Lemmon || Mount Lemmon Survey ||  || align=right | 2.3 km || 
|-id=053 bgcolor=#d6d6d6
| 542053 ||  || — || October 7, 2008 || Mount Lemmon || Mount Lemmon Survey ||  || align=right | 2.9 km || 
|-id=054 bgcolor=#d6d6d6
| 542054 ||  || — || May 16, 2012 || Mount Lemmon || Mount Lemmon Survey ||  || align=right | 2.3 km || 
|-id=055 bgcolor=#d6d6d6
| 542055 ||  || — || May 1, 2012 || Mount Lemmon || Mount Lemmon Survey ||  || align=right | 2.0 km || 
|-id=056 bgcolor=#d6d6d6
| 542056 ||  || — || April 27, 2012 || Haleakala || Pan-STARRS ||  || align=right | 2.1 km || 
|-id=057 bgcolor=#fefefe
| 542057 ||  || — || May 1, 2012 || Mount Lemmon || Mount Lemmon Survey ||  || align=right data-sort-value="0.78" | 780 m || 
|-id=058 bgcolor=#d6d6d6
| 542058 ||  || — || June 9, 2007 || Kitt Peak || Spacewatch ||  || align=right | 3.0 km || 
|-id=059 bgcolor=#E9E9E9
| 542059 ||  || — || February 2, 2006 || Mauna Kea || Mauna Kea Obs. ||  || align=right | 1.7 km || 
|-id=060 bgcolor=#d6d6d6
| 542060 ||  || — || May 21, 2012 || Haleakala || Pan-STARRS ||  || align=right | 2.6 km || 
|-id=061 bgcolor=#d6d6d6
| 542061 ||  || — || December 3, 2008 || Kitt Peak || Spacewatch ||  || align=right | 3.3 km || 
|-id=062 bgcolor=#d6d6d6
| 542062 ||  || — || September 12, 2002 || Palomar || NEAT ||  || align=right | 4.3 km || 
|-id=063 bgcolor=#d6d6d6
| 542063 ||  || — || March 5, 2011 || Catalina || CSS ||  || align=right | 3.7 km || 
|-id=064 bgcolor=#fefefe
| 542064 ||  || — || May 20, 2012 || Kitt Peak || Spacewatch ||  || align=right data-sort-value="0.79" | 790 m || 
|-id=065 bgcolor=#d6d6d6
| 542065 ||  || — || May 28, 2012 || Mount Lemmon || Mount Lemmon Survey ||  || align=right | 3.1 km || 
|-id=066 bgcolor=#d6d6d6
| 542066 ||  || — || May 31, 2012 || Mount Lemmon || Mount Lemmon Survey ||  || align=right | 3.0 km || 
|-id=067 bgcolor=#d6d6d6
| 542067 ||  || — || November 1, 2008 || Mount Lemmon || Mount Lemmon Survey || Tj (2.98) || align=right | 3.3 km || 
|-id=068 bgcolor=#fefefe
| 542068 ||  || — || May 21, 2012 || Haleakala || Pan-STARRS ||  || align=right data-sort-value="0.68" | 680 m || 
|-id=069 bgcolor=#FA8072
| 542069 ||  || — || April 25, 2012 || Mount Lemmon || Mount Lemmon Survey ||  || align=right data-sort-value="0.66" | 660 m || 
|-id=070 bgcolor=#d6d6d6
| 542070 ||  || — || June 12, 2012 || Catalina || CSS ||  || align=right | 3.8 km || 
|-id=071 bgcolor=#d6d6d6
| 542071 ||  || — || September 28, 2008 || Mount Lemmon || Mount Lemmon Survey ||  || align=right | 3.1 km || 
|-id=072 bgcolor=#d6d6d6
| 542072 ||  || — || June 15, 2012 || Mount Lemmon || Mount Lemmon Sky Center ||  || align=right | 2.8 km || 
|-id=073 bgcolor=#d6d6d6
| 542073 ||  || — || January 13, 2005 || Kitt Peak || Spacewatch ||  || align=right | 3.2 km || 
|-id=074 bgcolor=#d6d6d6
| 542074 ||  || — || May 27, 2012 || Mount Lemmon || Mount Lemmon Survey ||  || align=right | 2.5 km || 
|-id=075 bgcolor=#d6d6d6
| 542075 ||  || — || June 9, 2012 || Mount Lemmon || Mount Lemmon Survey ||  || align=right | 2.9 km || 
|-id=076 bgcolor=#fefefe
| 542076 ||  || — || August 19, 2006 || Kitt Peak || Spacewatch ||  || align=right data-sort-value="0.56" | 560 m || 
|-id=077 bgcolor=#d6d6d6
| 542077 ||  || — || December 5, 2010 || Mount Lemmon || Mount Lemmon Survey ||  || align=right | 3.0 km || 
|-id=078 bgcolor=#d6d6d6
| 542078 ||  || — || June 11, 2012 || Haleakala || Pan-STARRS ||  || align=right | 2.9 km || 
|-id=079 bgcolor=#d6d6d6
| 542079 ||  || — || June 11, 2012 || Haleakala || Pan-STARRS ||  || align=right | 2.5 km || 
|-id=080 bgcolor=#d6d6d6
| 542080 ||  || — || May 21, 2012 || Haleakala || Pan-STARRS ||  || align=right | 2.8 km || 
|-id=081 bgcolor=#d6d6d6
| 542081 ||  || — || September 25, 2008 || Mount Lemmon || Mount Lemmon Survey ||  || align=right | 2.9 km || 
|-id=082 bgcolor=#E9E9E9
| 542082 ||  || — || July 30, 1995 || Kitt Peak || Spacewatch ||  || align=right | 2.1 km || 
|-id=083 bgcolor=#d6d6d6
| 542083 ||  || — || May 22, 2001 || Anderson Mesa || LONEOS || TIR || align=right | 3.8 km || 
|-id=084 bgcolor=#d6d6d6
| 542084 ||  || — || July 12, 2012 || Zelenchukskaya St. || T. V. Kryachko, B. Satovski || Tj (2.99) || align=right | 3.8 km || 
|-id=085 bgcolor=#fefefe
| 542085 ||  || — || June 15, 2012 || Mount Lemmon || Mount Lemmon Survey ||  || align=right data-sort-value="0.69" | 690 m || 
|-id=086 bgcolor=#d6d6d6
| 542086 ||  || — || May 29, 2012 || Mount Lemmon || Mount Lemmon Survey ||  || align=right | 3.1 km || 
|-id=087 bgcolor=#d6d6d6
| 542087 ||  || — || February 26, 2009 || Kitt Peak || Spacewatch || 7:4* || align=right | 3.8 km || 
|-id=088 bgcolor=#fefefe
| 542088 ||  || — || February 8, 2008 || Kitt Peak || Spacewatch ||  || align=right data-sort-value="0.87" | 870 m || 
|-id=089 bgcolor=#fefefe
| 542089 ||  || — || June 13, 2005 || Mount Lemmon || Mount Lemmon Survey ||  || align=right data-sort-value="0.62" | 620 m || 
|-id=090 bgcolor=#d6d6d6
| 542090 ||  || — || August 22, 2012 || Westfield || ARO ||  || align=right | 3.1 km || 
|-id=091 bgcolor=#fefefe
| 542091 ||  || — || December 19, 2009 || Mount Lemmon || Mount Lemmon Survey ||  || align=right data-sort-value="0.86" | 860 m || 
|-id=092 bgcolor=#d6d6d6
| 542092 ||  || — || September 14, 2012 || ISON-Kislovodsk Observatory || V. Nevski, A. Novichonok ||  || align=right | 3.4 km || 
|-id=093 bgcolor=#d6d6d6
| 542093 ||  || — || February 14, 2010 || Mount Lemmon || Mount Lemmon Survey ||  || align=right | 3.4 km || 
|-id=094 bgcolor=#fefefe
| 542094 ||  || — || August 25, 2012 || Catalina || CSS ||  || align=right data-sort-value="0.70" | 700 m || 
|-id=095 bgcolor=#d6d6d6
| 542095 ||  || — || October 8, 2007 || Catalina || CSS ||  || align=right | 3.3 km || 
|-id=096 bgcolor=#d6d6d6
| 542096 ||  || — || September 18, 2012 || Mount Lemmon || Mount Lemmon Survey ||  || align=right | 3.1 km || 
|-id=097 bgcolor=#d6d6d6
| 542097 ||  || — || February 14, 2004 || Kitt Peak || Spacewatch ||  || align=right | 3.2 km || 
|-id=098 bgcolor=#fefefe
| 542098 ||  || — || September 19, 2012 || Mount Lemmon || Mount Lemmon Survey ||  || align=right data-sort-value="0.68" | 680 m || 
|-id=099 bgcolor=#fefefe
| 542099 ||  || — || May 11, 2005 || Palomar || NEAT ||  || align=right data-sort-value="0.71" | 710 m || 
|-id=100 bgcolor=#d6d6d6
| 542100 ||  || — || September 17, 2006 || Catalina || CSS ||  || align=right | 4.3 km || 
|}

542101–542200 

|-bgcolor=#d6d6d6
| 542101 ||  || — || February 2, 2009 || Kitt Peak || Spacewatch ||  || align=right | 2.6 km || 
|-id=102 bgcolor=#fefefe
| 542102 ||  || — || April 11, 2008 || Mount Lemmon || Mount Lemmon Survey ||  || align=right data-sort-value="0.77" | 770 m || 
|-id=103 bgcolor=#d6d6d6
| 542103 ||  || — || April 1, 2003 || Cerro Tololo || Cerro Tololo Obs. || 7:4 || align=right | 4.1 km || 
|-id=104 bgcolor=#fefefe
| 542104 ||  || — || September 5, 2005 || Bergisch Gladbach || Bergisch Gladbach Obs. ||  || align=right data-sort-value="0.71" | 710 m || 
|-id=105 bgcolor=#fefefe
| 542105 ||  || — || October 30, 2005 || Mount Lemmon || Mount Lemmon Survey ||  || align=right data-sort-value="0.65" | 650 m || 
|-id=106 bgcolor=#fefefe
| 542106 ||  || — || October 11, 2002 || Palomar || NEAT ||  || align=right data-sort-value="0.57" | 570 m || 
|-id=107 bgcolor=#fefefe
| 542107 ||  || — || November 18, 2009 || Kitt Peak || Spacewatch ||  || align=right data-sort-value="0.78" | 780 m || 
|-id=108 bgcolor=#d6d6d6
| 542108 ||  || — || October 12, 2012 || Alianza S4 || Alianza S4 Obs. || VER || align=right | 2.5 km || 
|-id=109 bgcolor=#fefefe
| 542109 ||  || — || April 1, 2011 || Mount Lemmon || Mount Lemmon Survey ||  || align=right data-sort-value="0.71" | 710 m || 
|-id=110 bgcolor=#fefefe
| 542110 ||  || — || January 17, 2007 || Kitt Peak || Spacewatch ||  || align=right data-sort-value="0.94" | 940 m || 
|-id=111 bgcolor=#fefefe
| 542111 ||  || — || October 8, 2012 || Kitt Peak || Spacewatch || NYS || align=right data-sort-value="0.60" | 600 m || 
|-id=112 bgcolor=#fefefe
| 542112 ||  || — || August 10, 2001 || Palomar || NEAT ||  || align=right data-sort-value="0.71" | 710 m || 
|-id=113 bgcolor=#fefefe
| 542113 ||  || — || October 15, 2012 || Mount Lemmon || Mount Lemmon Survey || V || align=right data-sort-value="0.52" | 520 m || 
|-id=114 bgcolor=#fefefe
| 542114 ||  || — || October 15, 2012 || Mount Lemmon || Mount Lemmon Survey ||  || align=right data-sort-value="0.97" | 970 m || 
|-id=115 bgcolor=#fefefe
| 542115 ||  || — || October 8, 2012 || Mount Lemmon || Mount Lemmon Survey ||  || align=right data-sort-value="0.68" | 680 m || 
|-id=116 bgcolor=#d6d6d6
| 542116 ||  || — || September 19, 1995 || Kitt Peak || Spacewatch ||  || align=right | 2.7 km || 
|-id=117 bgcolor=#fefefe
| 542117 ||  || — || November 5, 2005 || Anderson Mesa || LONEOS ||  || align=right data-sort-value="0.75" | 750 m || 
|-id=118 bgcolor=#fefefe
| 542118 ||  || — || April 19, 2007 || Kitt Peak || Spacewatch ||  || align=right data-sort-value="0.78" | 780 m || 
|-id=119 bgcolor=#fefefe
| 542119 ||  || — || October 15, 2001 || Palomar || NEAT ||  || align=right data-sort-value="0.68" | 680 m || 
|-id=120 bgcolor=#fefefe
| 542120 ||  || — || July 20, 2004 || Siding Spring || SSS ||  || align=right | 1.2 km || 
|-id=121 bgcolor=#fefefe
| 542121 ||  || — || January 23, 2006 || Kitt Peak || Spacewatch ||  || align=right data-sort-value="0.71" | 710 m || 
|-id=122 bgcolor=#fefefe
| 542122 ||  || — || November 26, 2005 || Kitt Peak || Spacewatch ||  || align=right data-sort-value="0.65" | 650 m || 
|-id=123 bgcolor=#fefefe
| 542123 ||  || — || November 13, 2012 || ESA Optical Ground Station || ESA OGS ||  || align=right data-sort-value="0.65" | 650 m || 
|-id=124 bgcolor=#fefefe
| 542124 ||  || — || October 22, 2005 || Kitt Peak || Spacewatch ||  || align=right data-sort-value="0.71" | 710 m || 
|-id=125 bgcolor=#fefefe
| 542125 ||  || — || October 25, 2005 || Mount Lemmon || Mount Lemmon Survey ||  || align=right data-sort-value="0.43" | 430 m || 
|-id=126 bgcolor=#fefefe
| 542126 ||  || — || October 19, 2001 || Anderson Mesa || LONEOS ||  || align=right data-sort-value="0.80" | 800 m || 
|-id=127 bgcolor=#fefefe
| 542127 ||  || — || November 17, 2012 || Kitt Peak || Spacewatch ||  || align=right data-sort-value="0.75" | 750 m || 
|-id=128 bgcolor=#fefefe
| 542128 ||  || — || November 28, 2005 || Mount Lemmon || Mount Lemmon Survey || NYS || align=right data-sort-value="0.52" | 520 m || 
|-id=129 bgcolor=#fefefe
| 542129 ||  || — || September 23, 2008 || Mount Lemmon || Mount Lemmon Survey ||  || align=right data-sort-value="0.70" | 700 m || 
|-id=130 bgcolor=#fefefe
| 542130 ||  || — || November 17, 2001 || Kitt Peak || Spacewatch ||  || align=right data-sort-value="0.90" | 900 m || 
|-id=131 bgcolor=#fefefe
| 542131 ||  || — || November 17, 2012 || Mount Lemmon || Mount Lemmon Survey ||  || align=right data-sort-value="0.64" | 640 m || 
|-id=132 bgcolor=#fefefe
| 542132 ||  || — || September 24, 2008 || Mount Lemmon || Mount Lemmon Survey ||  || align=right data-sort-value="0.67" | 670 m || 
|-id=133 bgcolor=#fefefe
| 542133 ||  || — || November 26, 2009 || Mount Lemmon || Mount Lemmon Survey ||  || align=right data-sort-value="0.78" | 780 m || 
|-id=134 bgcolor=#fefefe
| 542134 ||  || — || November 25, 2012 || Kitt Peak || Spacewatch ||  || align=right data-sort-value="0.78" | 780 m || 
|-id=135 bgcolor=#fefefe
| 542135 ||  || — || December 18, 2009 || Kitt Peak || Spacewatch ||  || align=right data-sort-value="0.90" | 900 m || 
|-id=136 bgcolor=#fefefe
| 542136 ||  || — || December 30, 2005 || Kitt Peak || Spacewatch || MAS || align=right data-sort-value="0.62" | 620 m || 
|-id=137 bgcolor=#fefefe
| 542137 ||  || — || November 4, 2012 || Kitt Peak || Spacewatch ||  || align=right data-sort-value="0.86" | 860 m || 
|-id=138 bgcolor=#fefefe
| 542138 ||  || — || October 10, 2008 || Mount Lemmon || Mount Lemmon Survey ||  || align=right data-sort-value="0.87" | 870 m || 
|-id=139 bgcolor=#fefefe
| 542139 ||  || — || September 23, 2008 || Mount Lemmon || Mount Lemmon Survey ||  || align=right data-sort-value="0.60" | 600 m || 
|-id=140 bgcolor=#fefefe
| 542140 ||  || — || September 23, 2008 || Kitt Peak || Spacewatch ||  || align=right data-sort-value="0.74" | 740 m || 
|-id=141 bgcolor=#fefefe
| 542141 ||  || — || April 28, 2011 || Kitt Peak || Spacewatch ||  || align=right data-sort-value="0.75" | 750 m || 
|-id=142 bgcolor=#fefefe
| 542142 ||  || — || December 10, 2005 || Kitt Peak || Spacewatch ||  || align=right data-sort-value="0.78" | 780 m || 
|-id=143 bgcolor=#FA8072
| 542143 ||  || — || December 8, 2012 || Nogales || M. Schwartz, P. R. Holvorcem ||  || align=right data-sort-value="0.71" | 710 m || 
|-id=144 bgcolor=#fefefe
| 542144 ||  || — || February 22, 2003 || Palomar || NEAT ||  || align=right data-sort-value="0.74" | 740 m || 
|-id=145 bgcolor=#fefefe
| 542145 ||  || — || October 22, 2005 || Palomar || NEAT ||  || align=right data-sort-value="0.75" | 750 m || 
|-id=146 bgcolor=#fefefe
| 542146 ||  || — || February 17, 2010 || Mount Lemmon || Mount Lemmon Survey ||  || align=right data-sort-value="0.67" | 670 m || 
|-id=147 bgcolor=#fefefe
| 542147 ||  || — || January 8, 2010 || Kitt Peak || Spacewatch ||  || align=right data-sort-value="0.80" | 800 m || 
|-id=148 bgcolor=#fefefe
| 542148 ||  || — || October 6, 2008 || Mount Lemmon || Mount Lemmon Survey ||  || align=right data-sort-value="0.75" | 750 m || 
|-id=149 bgcolor=#fefefe
| 542149 ||  || — || November 12, 2012 || Mount Lemmon || Mount Lemmon Survey ||  || align=right data-sort-value="0.78" | 780 m || 
|-id=150 bgcolor=#fefefe
| 542150 ||  || — || November 12, 2012 || Mount Lemmon || Mount Lemmon Survey ||  || align=right data-sort-value="0.65" | 650 m || 
|-id=151 bgcolor=#fefefe
| 542151 ||  || — || November 10, 2005 || Mount Lemmon || Mount Lemmon Survey ||  || align=right data-sort-value="0.78" | 780 m || 
|-id=152 bgcolor=#fefefe
| 542152 ||  || — || December 5, 2012 || Mount Lemmon || Mount Lemmon Survey ||  || align=right data-sort-value="0.74" | 740 m || 
|-id=153 bgcolor=#fefefe
| 542153 ||  || — || October 30, 2005 || Mount Lemmon || Mount Lemmon Survey ||  || align=right data-sort-value="0.65" | 650 m || 
|-id=154 bgcolor=#fefefe
| 542154 ||  || — || November 7, 2012 || Mount Lemmon || Mount Lemmon Survey ||  || align=right data-sort-value="0.65" | 650 m || 
|-id=155 bgcolor=#fefefe
| 542155 ||  || — || March 20, 2007 || Kitt Peak || Spacewatch ||  || align=right data-sort-value="0.91" | 910 m || 
|-id=156 bgcolor=#fefefe
| 542156 ||  || — || June 3, 2011 || Catalina || CSS ||  || align=right data-sort-value="0.86" | 860 m || 
|-id=157 bgcolor=#fefefe
| 542157 ||  || — || December 6, 2012 || Mount Lemmon || Mount Lemmon Survey ||  || align=right data-sort-value="0.71" | 710 m || 
|-id=158 bgcolor=#fefefe
| 542158 ||  || — || November 7, 2012 || Mount Lemmon || Mount Lemmon Survey ||  || align=right data-sort-value="0.91" | 910 m || 
|-id=159 bgcolor=#fefefe
| 542159 ||  || — || September 20, 2008 || Mount Lemmon || Mount Lemmon Survey ||  || align=right data-sort-value="0.73" | 730 m || 
|-id=160 bgcolor=#d6d6d6
| 542160 ||  || — || October 3, 2011 || XuYi || PMO NEO || (6124)3:2 || align=right | 3.8 km || 
|-id=161 bgcolor=#fefefe
| 542161 ||  || — || December 3, 2012 || Mount Lemmon || Mount Lemmon Survey ||  || align=right data-sort-value="0.62" | 620 m || 
|-id=162 bgcolor=#FA8072
| 542162 ||  || — || November 20, 2012 || Mount Lemmon || Mount Lemmon Survey || H || align=right data-sort-value="0.64" | 640 m || 
|-id=163 bgcolor=#fefefe
| 542163 ||  || — || December 2, 2008 || Mount Lemmon || Mount Lemmon Survey ||  || align=right data-sort-value="0.82" | 820 m || 
|-id=164 bgcolor=#fefefe
| 542164 ||  || — || August 1, 2011 || Haleakala || Pan-STARRS ||  || align=right data-sort-value="0.94" | 940 m || 
|-id=165 bgcolor=#fefefe
| 542165 ||  || — || August 22, 2003 || Palomar || NEAT ||  || align=right | 1.3 km || 
|-id=166 bgcolor=#E9E9E9
| 542166 ||  || — || November 30, 2008 || Kitt Peak || Spacewatch ||  || align=right | 1.1 km || 
|-id=167 bgcolor=#d6d6d6
| 542167 ||  || — || December 6, 2007 || Mount Lemmon || Mount Lemmon Survey ||  || align=right | 3.5 km || 
|-id=168 bgcolor=#E9E9E9
| 542168 ||  || — || July 26, 2001 || Kitt Peak || Spacewatch ||  || align=right | 3.4 km || 
|-id=169 bgcolor=#C2FFFF
| 542169 ||  || — || November 23, 2011 || Kitt Peak || Spacewatch || L4ERY || align=right | 10 km || 
|-id=170 bgcolor=#E9E9E9
| 542170 ||  || — || June 4, 2002 || Palomar || NEAT ||  || align=right | 1.3 km || 
|-id=171 bgcolor=#E9E9E9
| 542171 ||  || — || October 7, 2012 || Oukaimeden || C. Rinner ||  || align=right | 1.7 km || 
|-id=172 bgcolor=#E9E9E9
| 542172 ||  || — || December 9, 2012 || Kitt Peak || Spacewatch ||  || align=right | 2.6 km || 
|-id=173 bgcolor=#E9E9E9
| 542173 ||  || — || November 29, 2003 || Kitt Peak || Spacewatch ||  || align=right | 1.9 km || 
|-id=174 bgcolor=#fefefe
| 542174 ||  || — || August 1, 2001 || Palomar || NEAT ||  || align=right | 1.0 km || 
|-id=175 bgcolor=#fefefe
| 542175 ||  || — || September 11, 2007 || Mount Lemmon || Mount Lemmon Survey ||  || align=right data-sort-value="0.89" | 890 m || 
|-id=176 bgcolor=#E9E9E9
| 542176 ||  || — || August 23, 2006 || Palomar || NEAT || AGN || align=right | 1.5 km || 
|-id=177 bgcolor=#E9E9E9
| 542177 ||  || — || November 24, 2008 || Calvin-Rehoboth || L. A. Molnar ||  || align=right | 1.4 km || 
|-id=178 bgcolor=#fefefe
| 542178 ||  || — || October 7, 2008 || Mount Lemmon || Mount Lemmon Survey ||  || align=right data-sort-value="0.73" | 730 m || 
|-id=179 bgcolor=#fefefe
| 542179 ||  || — || December 2, 2005 || Kitt Peak || L. H. Wasserman, R. Millis ||  || align=right data-sort-value="0.73" | 730 m || 
|-id=180 bgcolor=#fefefe
| 542180 ||  || — || January 8, 2013 || Oukaimeden || M. Ory ||  || align=right data-sort-value="0.72" | 720 m || 
|-id=181 bgcolor=#fefefe
| 542181 ||  || — || September 28, 2008 || Mount Lemmon || Mount Lemmon Survey ||  || align=right data-sort-value="0.81" | 810 m || 
|-id=182 bgcolor=#E9E9E9
| 542182 ||  || — || September 13, 2002 || Palomar || NEAT ||  || align=right | 2.4 km || 
|-id=183 bgcolor=#fefefe
| 542183 ||  || — || December 22, 2005 || Kitt Peak || Spacewatch || NYS || align=right data-sort-value="0.55" | 550 m || 
|-id=184 bgcolor=#fefefe
| 542184 ||  || — || January 22, 2006 || Mount Lemmon || Mount Lemmon Survey ||  || align=right data-sort-value="0.98" | 980 m || 
|-id=185 bgcolor=#d6d6d6
| 542185 ||  || — || January 5, 2013 || Kitt Peak || Spacewatch ||  || align=right | 2.5 km || 
|-id=186 bgcolor=#E9E9E9
| 542186 ||  || — || November 9, 2007 || Kitt Peak || Spacewatch ||  || align=right | 1.4 km || 
|-id=187 bgcolor=#C2FFFF
| 542187 ||  || — || October 15, 2012 || Kitt Peak || Spacewatch || L4 || align=right | 11 km || 
|-id=188 bgcolor=#fefefe
| 542188 ||  || — || January 5, 2013 || Mount Lemmon || Mount Lemmon Survey ||  || align=right data-sort-value="0.75" | 750 m || 
|-id=189 bgcolor=#fefefe
| 542189 ||  || — || January 23, 2006 || Mount Lemmon || Mount Lemmon Survey ||  || align=right data-sort-value="0.70" | 700 m || 
|-id=190 bgcolor=#E9E9E9
| 542190 ||  || — || January 5, 2013 || Kitt Peak || Spacewatch ||  || align=right | 1.00 km || 
|-id=191 bgcolor=#E9E9E9
| 542191 ||  || — || November 12, 2012 || Mount Lemmon || Mount Lemmon Survey ||  || align=right | 1.1 km || 
|-id=192 bgcolor=#FA8072
| 542192 ||  || — || November 12, 2012 || Mount Lemmon || Mount Lemmon Survey ||  || align=right data-sort-value="0.86" | 860 m || 
|-id=193 bgcolor=#E9E9E9
| 542193 ||  || — || October 18, 2007 || Kitt Peak || Spacewatch ||  || align=right | 1.9 km || 
|-id=194 bgcolor=#E9E9E9
| 542194 ||  || — || September 12, 2002 || Palomar || NEAT || GEF || align=right | 1.3 km || 
|-id=195 bgcolor=#C2FFFF
| 542195 ||  || — || September 15, 2009 || Kitt Peak || Spacewatch || L4 || align=right | 9.1 km || 
|-id=196 bgcolor=#d6d6d6
| 542196 ||  || — || January 6, 2013 || Kitt Peak || Spacewatch ||  || align=right | 3.2 km || 
|-id=197 bgcolor=#fefefe
| 542197 ||  || — || January 6, 2013 || Kitt Peak || Spacewatch ||  || align=right data-sort-value="0.67" | 670 m || 
|-id=198 bgcolor=#E9E9E9
| 542198 ||  || — || November 19, 2007 || Mount Lemmon || Mount Lemmon Survey ||  || align=right | 1.9 km || 
|-id=199 bgcolor=#fefefe
| 542199 ||  || — || October 28, 2008 || Mount Lemmon || Mount Lemmon Survey ||  || align=right data-sort-value="0.65" | 650 m || 
|-id=200 bgcolor=#d6d6d6
| 542200 ||  || — || November 13, 2012 || Mount Lemmon || Mount Lemmon Survey ||  || align=right | 3.0 km || 
|}

542201–542300 

|-bgcolor=#fefefe
| 542201 ||  || — || January 6, 2013 || Mount Lemmon || Mount Lemmon Survey ||  || align=right data-sort-value="0.77" | 770 m || 
|-id=202 bgcolor=#fefefe
| 542202 ||  || — || December 17, 1999 || Kitt Peak || Spacewatch ||  || align=right data-sort-value="0.77" | 770 m || 
|-id=203 bgcolor=#E9E9E9
| 542203 ||  || — || October 10, 2007 || Mount Lemmon || Mount Lemmon Survey ||  || align=right | 2.3 km || 
|-id=204 bgcolor=#fefefe
| 542204 ||  || — || February 25, 2007 || Mount Lemmon || Mount Lemmon Survey ||  || align=right data-sort-value="0.69" | 690 m || 
|-id=205 bgcolor=#fefefe
| 542205 ||  || — || January 4, 2013 || Mount Lemmon || Mount Lemmon Survey ||  || align=right data-sort-value="0.86" | 860 m || 
|-id=206 bgcolor=#C2FFFF
| 542206 ||  || — || December 21, 2011 || Mayhill-ISON || L. Elenin || L4 || align=right | 11 km || 
|-id=207 bgcolor=#C2FFFF
| 542207 ||  || — || November 5, 2010 || Mount Lemmon || Mount Lemmon Survey || L4 || align=right | 8.6 km || 
|-id=208 bgcolor=#fefefe
| 542208 ||  || — || September 13, 2004 || Kitt Peak || Spacewatch ||  || align=right data-sort-value="0.71" | 710 m || 
|-id=209 bgcolor=#C2FFFF
| 542209 ||  || — || January 4, 2013 || Kitt Peak || Spacewatch || L4 || align=right | 12 km || 
|-id=210 bgcolor=#fefefe
| 542210 ||  || — || January 10, 2013 || Haleakala || Pan-STARRS ||  || align=right data-sort-value="0.57" | 570 m || 
|-id=211 bgcolor=#E9E9E9
| 542211 ||  || — || November 19, 2003 || Palomar || NEAT ||  || align=right | 1.6 km || 
|-id=212 bgcolor=#fefefe
| 542212 ||  || — || October 7, 2005 || Mauna Kea || Mauna Kea Obs. || V || align=right data-sort-value="0.85" | 850 m || 
|-id=213 bgcolor=#fefefe
| 542213 ||  || — || December 11, 2012 || Kitt Peak || Spacewatch ||  || align=right data-sort-value="0.66" | 660 m || 
|-id=214 bgcolor=#d6d6d6
| 542214 ||  || — || September 24, 2011 || Haleakala || Pan-STARRS ||  || align=right | 2.3 km || 
|-id=215 bgcolor=#fefefe
| 542215 ||  || — || November 20, 2004 || Kitt Peak || Spacewatch ||  || align=right data-sort-value="0.98" | 980 m || 
|-id=216 bgcolor=#E9E9E9
| 542216 ||  || — || December 15, 2007 || Mount Lemmon || Mount Lemmon Survey ||  || align=right | 1.9 km || 
|-id=217 bgcolor=#d6d6d6
| 542217 ||  || — || December 23, 2012 || Haleakala || Pan-STARRS ||  || align=right | 2.2 km || 
|-id=218 bgcolor=#E9E9E9
| 542218 ||  || — || June 10, 2005 || Kitt Peak || Spacewatch ||  || align=right | 1.7 km || 
|-id=219 bgcolor=#fefefe
| 542219 ||  || — || January 15, 2013 || ESA OGS || ESA OGS ||  || align=right data-sort-value="0.76" | 760 m || 
|-id=220 bgcolor=#fefefe
| 542220 ||  || — || April 5, 2003 || Cerro Tololo || Cerro Tololo Obs. ||  || align=right data-sort-value="0.77" | 770 m || 
|-id=221 bgcolor=#d6d6d6
| 542221 ||  || — || January 15, 2013 || ESA OGS || ESA OGS ||  || align=right | 3.2 km || 
|-id=222 bgcolor=#E9E9E9
| 542222 ||  || — || December 29, 2008 || Mount Lemmon || Mount Lemmon Survey ||  || align=right | 2.2 km || 
|-id=223 bgcolor=#fefefe
| 542223 ||  || — || November 18, 2008 || Catalina || CSS ||  || align=right data-sort-value="0.90" | 900 m || 
|-id=224 bgcolor=#fefefe
| 542224 ||  || — || April 9, 2003 || Palomar || NEAT ||  || align=right | 1.0 km || 
|-id=225 bgcolor=#d6d6d6
| 542225 ||  || — || July 31, 2005 || Palomar || NEAT ||  || align=right | 3.7 km || 
|-id=226 bgcolor=#d6d6d6
| 542226 ||  || — || September 8, 2011 || Haleakala || Pan-STARRS || 7:4 || align=right | 3.8 km || 
|-id=227 bgcolor=#fefefe
| 542227 ||  || — || February 1, 2006 || Kitt Peak || Spacewatch ||  || align=right data-sort-value="0.68" | 680 m || 
|-id=228 bgcolor=#E9E9E9
| 542228 ||  || — || January 25, 2009 || Kitt Peak || Spacewatch ||  || align=right | 1.8 km || 
|-id=229 bgcolor=#E9E9E9
| 542229 ||  || — || January 8, 2013 || Mount Lemmon || Mount Lemmon Survey ||  || align=right | 2.3 km || 
|-id=230 bgcolor=#fefefe
| 542230 ||  || — || December 17, 2012 || Nogales || M. Schwartz, P. R. Holvorcem ||  || align=right data-sort-value="0.89" | 890 m || 
|-id=231 bgcolor=#E9E9E9
| 542231 ||  || — || September 25, 2003 || Palomar || NEAT ||  || align=right | 1.4 km || 
|-id=232 bgcolor=#fefefe
| 542232 ||  || — || January 10, 2013 || Haleakala || Pan-STARRS ||  || align=right data-sort-value="0.56" | 560 m || 
|-id=233 bgcolor=#fefefe
| 542233 ||  || — || September 29, 2011 || Piszkesteto || K. Sárneczky ||  || align=right | 1.1 km || 
|-id=234 bgcolor=#E9E9E9
| 542234 ||  || — || August 27, 2006 || Kitt Peak || Spacewatch ||  || align=right | 2.3 km || 
|-id=235 bgcolor=#fefefe
| 542235 ||  || — || January 10, 2013 || Haleakala || Pan-STARRS ||  || align=right data-sort-value="0.64" | 640 m || 
|-id=236 bgcolor=#d6d6d6
| 542236 ||  || — || September 23, 2011 || Kitt Peak || Spacewatch ||  || align=right | 2.0 km || 
|-id=237 bgcolor=#E9E9E9
| 542237 ||  || — || September 26, 2011 || Haleakala || Pan-STARRS ||  || align=right | 2.0 km || 
|-id=238 bgcolor=#fefefe
| 542238 ||  || — || January 14, 2013 || ESA OGS || ESA OGS ||  || align=right data-sort-value="0.68" | 680 m || 
|-id=239 bgcolor=#E9E9E9
| 542239 ||  || — || February 12, 2004 || Kitt Peak || Spacewatch || GEF || align=right | 1.4 km || 
|-id=240 bgcolor=#fefefe
| 542240 ||  || — || January 14, 2013 || ESA OGS || ESA OGS ||  || align=right data-sort-value="0.82" | 820 m || 
|-id=241 bgcolor=#fefefe
| 542241 ||  || — || December 23, 2012 || Haleakala || Pan-STARRS ||  || align=right data-sort-value="0.86" | 860 m || 
|-id=242 bgcolor=#E9E9E9
| 542242 ||  || — || December 12, 2012 || Mount Lemmon || Mount Lemmon Survey ||  || align=right | 2.6 km || 
|-id=243 bgcolor=#E9E9E9
| 542243 ||  || — || July 25, 2006 || Palomar || NEAT || GEF || align=right | 1.6 km || 
|-id=244 bgcolor=#fefefe
| 542244 ||  || — || January 6, 2013 || Kitt Peak || Spacewatch || NYS || align=right data-sort-value="0.55" | 550 m || 
|-id=245 bgcolor=#d6d6d6
| 542245 ||  || — || January 7, 2013 || Oukaimeden || M. Ory || URS || align=right | 3.5 km || 
|-id=246 bgcolor=#C2FFFF
| 542246 Kulcsár ||  ||  || August 26, 2008 || Piszkesteto || K. Sárneczky || L4 || align=right | 9.7 km || 
|-id=247 bgcolor=#fefefe
| 542247 ||  || — || December 12, 2012 || Nogales || M. Schwartz, P. R. Holvorcem ||  || align=right | 1.0 km || 
|-id=248 bgcolor=#fefefe
| 542248 ||  || — || February 17, 2010 || Kitt Peak || Spacewatch ||  || align=right data-sort-value="0.69" | 690 m || 
|-id=249 bgcolor=#fefefe
| 542249 ||  || — || July 5, 2003 || Kitt Peak || Spacewatch || NYS || align=right data-sort-value="0.69" | 690 m || 
|-id=250 bgcolor=#E9E9E9
| 542250 ||  || — || November 6, 2007 || Kitt Peak || Spacewatch ||  || align=right | 2.1 km || 
|-id=251 bgcolor=#fefefe
| 542251 ||  || — || June 21, 2014 || Haleakala || Pan-STARRS ||  || align=right data-sort-value="0.75" | 750 m || 
|-id=252 bgcolor=#fefefe
| 542252 ||  || — || June 10, 2007 || Kitt Peak || Spacewatch ||  || align=right data-sort-value="0.75" | 750 m || 
|-id=253 bgcolor=#E9E9E9
| 542253 ||  || — || January 20, 2013 || Mount Lemmon || Mount Lemmon Survey ||  || align=right data-sort-value="0.84" | 840 m || 
|-id=254 bgcolor=#E9E9E9
| 542254 ||  || — || April 2, 2005 || Kitt Peak || Spacewatch ||  || align=right | 2.1 km || 
|-id=255 bgcolor=#d6d6d6
| 542255 ||  || — || August 5, 2005 || Palomar || NEAT ||  || align=right | 2.7 km || 
|-id=256 bgcolor=#d6d6d6
| 542256 ||  || — || February 11, 2008 || Mount Lemmon || Mount Lemmon Survey ||  || align=right | 2.7 km || 
|-id=257 bgcolor=#E9E9E9
| 542257 ||  || — || September 20, 2003 || Palomar || NEAT ||  || align=right | 1.3 km || 
|-id=258 bgcolor=#C2E0FF
| 542258 ||  || — || May 21, 2014 || Haleakala || Pan-STARRS || res3:8 || align=right | 325 km || 
|-id=259 bgcolor=#E9E9E9
| 542259 ||  || — || September 2, 2011 || Haleakala || Pan-STARRS ||  || align=right | 1.4 km || 
|-id=260 bgcolor=#E9E9E9
| 542260 ||  || — || January 10, 2013 || Haleakala || Pan-STARRS ||  || align=right data-sort-value="0.66" | 660 m || 
|-id=261 bgcolor=#C2FFFF
| 542261 ||  || — || December 23, 2012 || Haleakala || Pan-STARRS || L4 || align=right | 7.8 km || 
|-id=262 bgcolor=#C2FFFF
| 542262 ||  || — || November 3, 2010 || Mount Lemmon || Mount Lemmon Survey || L4ERY || align=right | 8.7 km || 
|-id=263 bgcolor=#C2FFFF
| 542263 ||  || — || September 28, 2009 || Kitt Peak || Spacewatch || L4 || align=right | 10 km || 
|-id=264 bgcolor=#C2FFFF
| 542264 ||  || — || March 24, 2003 || Needville || J. Dellinger || L4 || align=right | 8.2 km || 
|-id=265 bgcolor=#C2FFFF
| 542265 ||  || — || October 17, 2009 || Mount Lemmon || Mount Lemmon Survey || L4 || align=right | 8.3 km || 
|-id=266 bgcolor=#d6d6d6
| 542266 ||  || — || January 16, 2013 || Mount Lemmon || Mount Lemmon Survey ||  || align=right | 3.6 km || 
|-id=267 bgcolor=#fefefe
| 542267 ||  || — || April 6, 2010 || Kitt Peak || Spacewatch ||  || align=right data-sort-value="0.97" | 970 m || 
|-id=268 bgcolor=#E9E9E9
| 542268 ||  || — || March 29, 2009 || Mount Lemmon || Mount Lemmon Survey ||  || align=right | 1.8 km || 
|-id=269 bgcolor=#fefefe
| 542269 ||  || — || November 7, 2008 || Mount Lemmon || Mount Lemmon Survey ||  || align=right data-sort-value="0.86" | 860 m || 
|-id=270 bgcolor=#E9E9E9
| 542270 ||  || — || January 16, 2013 || Haleakala || Pan-STARRS ||  || align=right | 1.9 km || 
|-id=271 bgcolor=#fefefe
| 542271 ||  || — || January 7, 2006 || Kitt Peak || Spacewatch ||  || align=right data-sort-value="0.90" | 900 m || 
|-id=272 bgcolor=#fefefe
| 542272 ||  || — || December 23, 2012 || Haleakala || Pan-STARRS || V || align=right data-sort-value="0.58" | 580 m || 
|-id=273 bgcolor=#fefefe
| 542273 ||  || — || December 30, 2005 || Mount Lemmon || Mount Lemmon Survey ||  || align=right data-sort-value="0.59" | 590 m || 
|-id=274 bgcolor=#E9E9E9
| 542274 ||  || — || February 11, 2004 || Palomar || NEAT ||  || align=right | 2.2 km || 
|-id=275 bgcolor=#C2FFFF
| 542275 ||  || — || November 2, 2010 || Mount Lemmon || Mount Lemmon Survey || L4 || align=right | 8.9 km || 
|-id=276 bgcolor=#C2FFFF
| 542276 ||  || — || December 13, 2012 || Kitt Peak || Spacewatch || L4 || align=right | 14 km || 
|-id=277 bgcolor=#fefefe
| 542277 ||  || — || October 10, 2004 || Kitt Peak || L. H. Wasserman, J. R. Lovering ||  || align=right data-sort-value="0.83" | 830 m || 
|-id=278 bgcolor=#fefefe
| 542278 ||  || — || October 2, 2008 || Catalina || CSS ||  || align=right data-sort-value="0.77" | 770 m || 
|-id=279 bgcolor=#fefefe
| 542279 ||  || — || April 9, 2002 || Palomar || NEAT ||  || align=right data-sort-value="0.95" | 950 m || 
|-id=280 bgcolor=#d6d6d6
| 542280 ||  || — || April 23, 2009 || Kitt Peak || Spacewatch ||  || align=right | 2.9 km || 
|-id=281 bgcolor=#fefefe
| 542281 ||  || — || January 16, 2013 || Mount Lemmon SkyCe || A. Kostin, T. Vorobjov ||  || align=right data-sort-value="0.98" | 980 m || 
|-id=282 bgcolor=#d6d6d6
| 542282 ||  || — || July 31, 2005 || Palomar || NEAT || EOS || align=right | 2.4 km || 
|-id=283 bgcolor=#E9E9E9
| 542283 ||  || — || January 16, 2013 || Haleakala || Pan-STARRS ||  || align=right | 1.7 km || 
|-id=284 bgcolor=#fefefe
| 542284 ||  || — || March 23, 2003 || Kitt Peak || Spacewatch || V || align=right data-sort-value="0.63" | 630 m || 
|-id=285 bgcolor=#E9E9E9
| 542285 ||  || — || December 8, 1999 || Kitt Peak || Spacewatch ||  || align=right | 1.4 km || 
|-id=286 bgcolor=#fefefe
| 542286 ||  || — || January 23, 2006 || Mount Lemmon || Mount Lemmon Survey ||  || align=right data-sort-value="0.70" | 700 m || 
|-id=287 bgcolor=#d6d6d6
| 542287 ||  || — || October 24, 2011 || Haleakala || Pan-STARRS ||  || align=right | 2.5 km || 
|-id=288 bgcolor=#E9E9E9
| 542288 ||  || — || August 22, 2003 || Palomar || NEAT ||  || align=right | 1.1 km || 
|-id=289 bgcolor=#d6d6d6
| 542289 ||  || — || March 11, 1997 || Kitt Peak || Spacewatch ||  || align=right | 2.4 km || 
|-id=290 bgcolor=#E9E9E9
| 542290 ||  || — || June 21, 2010 || Mount Lemmon || Mount Lemmon Survey ||  || align=right | 2.0 km || 
|-id=291 bgcolor=#E9E9E9
| 542291 ||  || — || August 27, 2006 || Kitt Peak || Spacewatch ||  || align=right | 2.5 km || 
|-id=292 bgcolor=#fefefe
| 542292 ||  || — || January 5, 2013 || Mount Lemmon || Mount Lemmon Survey ||  || align=right data-sort-value="0.65" | 650 m || 
|-id=293 bgcolor=#fefefe
| 542293 ||  || — || December 3, 2005 || Mauna Kea || Mauna Kea Obs. ||  || align=right data-sort-value="0.68" | 680 m || 
|-id=294 bgcolor=#d6d6d6
| 542294 ||  || — || November 1, 2006 || Mount Lemmon || Mount Lemmon Survey ||  || align=right | 2.1 km || 
|-id=295 bgcolor=#fefefe
| 542295 ||  || — || October 26, 2008 || Kitt Peak || Spacewatch || (5026) || align=right data-sort-value="0.67" | 670 m || 
|-id=296 bgcolor=#d6d6d6
| 542296 ||  || — || November 3, 2011 || Catalina || CSS || Tj (2.92) || align=right | 3.7 km || 
|-id=297 bgcolor=#E9E9E9
| 542297 ||  || — || January 16, 2013 || Haleakala || Pan-STARRS ||  || align=right | 2.0 km || 
|-id=298 bgcolor=#fefefe
| 542298 ||  || — || December 31, 2008 || Piszkesteto || K. Sárneczky ||  || align=right data-sort-value="0.99" | 990 m || 
|-id=299 bgcolor=#fefefe
| 542299 ||  || — || April 18, 1998 || Kitt Peak || Spacewatch ||  || align=right data-sort-value="0.77" | 770 m || 
|-id=300 bgcolor=#fefefe
| 542300 ||  || — || January 16, 2013 || Haleakala || Pan-STARRS ||  || align=right data-sort-value="0.82" | 820 m || 
|}

542301–542400 

|-bgcolor=#d6d6d6
| 542301 ||  || — || January 18, 2008 || Kitt Peak || Spacewatch ||  || align=right | 2.4 km || 
|-id=302 bgcolor=#fefefe
| 542302 ||  || — || November 8, 2008 || Mount Lemmon || Mount Lemmon Survey ||  || align=right data-sort-value="0.62" | 620 m || 
|-id=303 bgcolor=#d6d6d6
| 542303 ||  || — || August 12, 2010 || Kitt Peak || Spacewatch ||  || align=right | 3.3 km || 
|-id=304 bgcolor=#fefefe
| 542304 ||  || — || January 5, 2013 || Kitt Peak || Spacewatch ||  || align=right data-sort-value="0.73" | 730 m || 
|-id=305 bgcolor=#fefefe
| 542305 ||  || — || November 9, 2008 || Kitt Peak || Spacewatch ||  || align=right data-sort-value="0.65" | 650 m || 
|-id=306 bgcolor=#fefefe
| 542306 ||  || — || November 20, 2008 || Kitt Peak || Spacewatch ||  || align=right data-sort-value="0.69" | 690 m || 
|-id=307 bgcolor=#fefefe
| 542307 ||  || — || January 10, 2013 || Oukaimeden || M. Ory ||  || align=right data-sort-value="0.98" | 980 m || 
|-id=308 bgcolor=#fefefe
| 542308 ||  || — || June 8, 2011 || Mount Lemmon || Mount Lemmon Survey || H || align=right data-sort-value="0.88" | 880 m || 
|-id=309 bgcolor=#d6d6d6
| 542309 ||  || — || August 31, 2005 || Kitt Peak || Spacewatch ||  || align=right | 2.7 km || 
|-id=310 bgcolor=#fefefe
| 542310 ||  || — || July 27, 2011 || Haleakala || Pan-STARRS || PHO || align=right | 1.1 km || 
|-id=311 bgcolor=#fefefe
| 542311 ||  || — || January 14, 2002 || Kitt Peak || Spacewatch ||  || align=right data-sort-value="0.78" | 780 m || 
|-id=312 bgcolor=#fefefe
| 542312 ||  || — || September 23, 2008 || Kitt Peak || Spacewatch ||  || align=right data-sort-value="0.63" | 630 m || 
|-id=313 bgcolor=#fefefe
| 542313 ||  || — || September 12, 2007 || Kitt Peak || Spacewatch ||  || align=right data-sort-value="0.86" | 860 m || 
|-id=314 bgcolor=#fefefe
| 542314 ||  || — || October 19, 2011 || Mount Lemmon || Mount Lemmon Survey ||  || align=right data-sort-value="0.71" | 710 m || 
|-id=315 bgcolor=#fefefe
| 542315 ||  || — || January 16, 2013 || Mount Lemmon || Mount Lemmon Survey ||  || align=right data-sort-value="0.62" | 620 m || 
|-id=316 bgcolor=#C2FFFF
| 542316 ||  || — || September 2, 2008 || Kitt Peak || Spacewatch || L4 || align=right | 7.6 km || 
|-id=317 bgcolor=#d6d6d6
| 542317 ||  || — || July 5, 2005 || Palomar || NEAT ||  || align=right | 3.7 km || 
|-id=318 bgcolor=#fefefe
| 542318 ||  || — || January 10, 2013 || Haleakala || Pan-STARRS ||  || align=right data-sort-value="0.59" | 590 m || 
|-id=319 bgcolor=#d6d6d6
| 542319 ||  || — || September 28, 2006 || Catalina || CSS ||  || align=right | 2.6 km || 
|-id=320 bgcolor=#E9E9E9
| 542320 ||  || — || February 27, 2009 || Kitt Peak || Spacewatch ||  || align=right | 1.6 km || 
|-id=321 bgcolor=#fefefe
| 542321 ||  || — || January 10, 2013 || Haleakala || Pan-STARRS ||  || align=right data-sort-value="0.86" | 860 m || 
|-id=322 bgcolor=#E9E9E9
| 542322 ||  || — || February 26, 2009 || Kitt Peak || Spacewatch ||  || align=right data-sort-value="0.93" | 930 m || 
|-id=323 bgcolor=#C2FFFF
| 542323 ||  || — || July 24, 2007 || Mauna Kea || Mauna Kea Obs. || L4ERY || align=right | 7.3 km || 
|-id=324 bgcolor=#E9E9E9
| 542324 ||  || — || March 8, 2005 || Mount Lemmon || Mount Lemmon Survey ||  || align=right | 1.0 km || 
|-id=325 bgcolor=#C2FFFF
| 542325 ||  || — || December 27, 2011 || Kitt Peak || Spacewatch || L4 || align=right | 9.3 km || 
|-id=326 bgcolor=#fefefe
| 542326 ||  || — || November 7, 2005 || Mauna Kea || Mauna Kea Obs. ||  || align=right data-sort-value="0.70" | 700 m || 
|-id=327 bgcolor=#fefefe
| 542327 ||  || — || March 25, 2006 || Mount Lemmon || Mount Lemmon Survey || MAS || align=right data-sort-value="0.82" | 820 m || 
|-id=328 bgcolor=#fefefe
| 542328 ||  || — || October 5, 2007 || Charleston || R. Holmes ||  || align=right | 1.0 km || 
|-id=329 bgcolor=#fefefe
| 542329 ||  || — || September 30, 2005 || Mauna Kea || Mauna Kea Obs. ||  || align=right data-sort-value="0.85" | 850 m || 
|-id=330 bgcolor=#d6d6d6
| 542330 ||  || — || September 27, 2011 || Mount Lemmon || Mount Lemmon Survey || LIX || align=right | 4.0 km || 
|-id=331 bgcolor=#fefefe
| 542331 ||  || — || February 4, 2013 || Oukaimeden || C. Rinner ||  || align=right | 1.2 km || 
|-id=332 bgcolor=#fefefe
| 542332 ||  || — || September 27, 2011 || Mount Lemmon || Mount Lemmon Survey ||  || align=right data-sort-value="0.79" | 790 m || 
|-id=333 bgcolor=#fefefe
| 542333 ||  || — || November 19, 2008 || Mount Lemmon || Mount Lemmon Survey ||  || align=right data-sort-value="0.68" | 680 m || 
|-id=334 bgcolor=#fefefe
| 542334 ||  || — || October 20, 2011 || Mount Lemmon || Mount Lemmon Survey ||  || align=right data-sort-value="0.88" | 880 m || 
|-id=335 bgcolor=#fefefe
| 542335 ||  || — || January 10, 2013 || Kitt Peak || Spacewatch ||  || align=right data-sort-value="0.63" | 630 m || 
|-id=336 bgcolor=#d6d6d6
| 542336 ||  || — || January 17, 2013 || Kitt Peak || Spacewatch ||  || align=right | 2.3 km || 
|-id=337 bgcolor=#d6d6d6
| 542337 ||  || — || June 16, 2004 || Kitt Peak || Spacewatch ||  || align=right | 3.3 km || 
|-id=338 bgcolor=#d6d6d6
| 542338 ||  || — || February 4, 2013 || Oukaimeden || C. Rinner ||  || align=right | 2.6 km || 
|-id=339 bgcolor=#fefefe
| 542339 ||  || — || December 1, 2005 || Mount Lemmon || Mount Lemmon Survey ||  || align=right data-sort-value="0.72" | 720 m || 
|-id=340 bgcolor=#d6d6d6
| 542340 ||  || — || October 22, 2006 || Kitt Peak || Spacewatch ||  || align=right | 2.0 km || 
|-id=341 bgcolor=#d6d6d6
| 542341 ||  || — || February 5, 2013 || Oukaimeden || C. Rinner ||  || align=right | 3.0 km || 
|-id=342 bgcolor=#E9E9E9
| 542342 ||  || — || January 26, 2004 || Anderson Mesa || LONEOS ||  || align=right | 3.5 km || 
|-id=343 bgcolor=#E9E9E9
| 542343 ||  || — || October 16, 2002 || Palomar || NEAT ||  || align=right | 1.7 km || 
|-id=344 bgcolor=#fefefe
| 542344 ||  || — || January 8, 2006 || Mount Lemmon || Mount Lemmon Survey || PHO || align=right data-sort-value="0.78" | 780 m || 
|-id=345 bgcolor=#E9E9E9
| 542345 ||  || — || July 7, 2003 || Palomar || NEAT ||  || align=right | 1.7 km || 
|-id=346 bgcolor=#C2FFFF
| 542346 ||  || — || March 26, 2003 || Palomar || NEAT || L4 || align=right | 9.8 km || 
|-id=347 bgcolor=#E9E9E9
| 542347 ||  || — || September 21, 2011 || Mount Lemmon || Mount Lemmon Survey ||  || align=right | 2.7 km || 
|-id=348 bgcolor=#fefefe
| 542348 ||  || — || January 21, 2013 || Mount Lemmon || Mount Lemmon Survey ||  || align=right data-sort-value="0.78" | 780 m || 
|-id=349 bgcolor=#d6d6d6
| 542349 ||  || — || February 6, 2013 || Catalina || CSS ||  || align=right | 3.0 km || 
|-id=350 bgcolor=#C2FFFF
| 542350 ||  || — || September 12, 2007 || Mount Lemmon || Mount Lemmon Survey || L4 || align=right | 9.4 km || 
|-id=351 bgcolor=#E9E9E9
| 542351 ||  || — || November 7, 2007 || Catalina || CSS ||  || align=right data-sort-value="0.95" | 950 m || 
|-id=352 bgcolor=#C2FFFF
| 542352 ||  || — || September 9, 2007 || Mauna Kea || Mauna Kea Obs. || L4 || align=right | 8.3 km || 
|-id=353 bgcolor=#fefefe
| 542353 ||  || — || July 27, 2001 || Anderson Mesa || LONEOS ||  || align=right data-sort-value="0.74" | 740 m || 
|-id=354 bgcolor=#d6d6d6
| 542354 ||  || — || January 18, 2013 || Oukaimeden || C. Rinner ||  || align=right | 2.5 km || 
|-id=355 bgcolor=#fefefe
| 542355 ||  || — || February 6, 2013 || Oukaimeden || C. Rinner || MAS || align=right data-sort-value="0.71" | 710 m || 
|-id=356 bgcolor=#d6d6d6
| 542356 ||  || — || October 24, 2011 || Haleakala || Pan-STARRS ||  || align=right | 2.2 km || 
|-id=357 bgcolor=#E9E9E9
| 542357 ||  || — || January 1, 2008 || Mount Lemmon || Mount Lemmon Survey ||  || align=right | 2.4 km || 
|-id=358 bgcolor=#d6d6d6
| 542358 ||  || — || October 20, 2011 || Mount Lemmon || Mount Lemmon Survey ||  || align=right | 1.9 km || 
|-id=359 bgcolor=#d6d6d6
| 542359 ||  || — || May 27, 1997 || Kitt Peak || Spacewatch ||  || align=right | 2.7 km || 
|-id=360 bgcolor=#E9E9E9
| 542360 ||  || — || January 18, 2013 || Haleakala || Pan-STARRS ||  || align=right data-sort-value="0.98" | 980 m || 
|-id=361 bgcolor=#E9E9E9
| 542361 ||  || — || October 25, 2003 || Kitt Peak || Spacewatch ||  || align=right | 1.2 km || 
|-id=362 bgcolor=#d6d6d6
| 542362 ||  || — || August 21, 2008 || Marly || P. Kocher || 3:2 || align=right | 6.7 km || 
|-id=363 bgcolor=#d6d6d6
| 542363 ||  || — || April 20, 2009 || Kitt Peak || Spacewatch ||  || align=right | 3.0 km || 
|-id=364 bgcolor=#fefefe
| 542364 ||  || — || September 27, 2008 || Mount Lemmon || Mount Lemmon Survey ||  || align=right data-sort-value="0.62" | 620 m || 
|-id=365 bgcolor=#E9E9E9
| 542365 ||  || — || August 21, 2006 || Kitt Peak || Spacewatch ||  || align=right | 2.8 km || 
|-id=366 bgcolor=#d6d6d6
| 542366 ||  || — || February 6, 2013 || Nogales || M. Schwartz, P. R. Holvorcem ||  || align=right | 2.8 km || 
|-id=367 bgcolor=#E9E9E9
| 542367 ||  || — || November 1, 2007 || Mount Lemmon || Mount Lemmon Survey ||  || align=right | 1.1 km || 
|-id=368 bgcolor=#fefefe
| 542368 ||  || — || February 7, 2013 || Catalina || CSS ||  || align=right data-sort-value="0.64" | 640 m || 
|-id=369 bgcolor=#fefefe
| 542369 ||  || — || October 22, 2008 || Kitt Peak || Spacewatch ||  || align=right data-sort-value="0.58" | 580 m || 
|-id=370 bgcolor=#fefefe
| 542370 ||  || — || February 8, 2013 || Haleakala || Pan-STARRS ||  || align=right data-sort-value="0.78" | 780 m || 
|-id=371 bgcolor=#d6d6d6
| 542371 ||  || — || December 7, 2001 || Kitt Peak || Spacewatch ||  || align=right | 3.2 km || 
|-id=372 bgcolor=#fefefe
| 542372 ||  || — || September 30, 2005 || Mauna Kea || Mauna Kea Obs. ||  || align=right data-sort-value="0.62" | 620 m || 
|-id=373 bgcolor=#fefefe
| 542373 ||  || — || April 9, 2002 || Palomar || NEAT ||  || align=right | 1.1 km || 
|-id=374 bgcolor=#d6d6d6
| 542374 ||  || — || February 6, 2002 || Palomar || NEAT || EOS || align=right | 2.2 km || 
|-id=375 bgcolor=#d6d6d6
| 542375 ||  || — || July 21, 2004 || Siding Spring || SSS ||  || align=right | 3.5 km || 
|-id=376 bgcolor=#fefefe
| 542376 ||  || — || March 3, 2006 || Kitt Peak || Spacewatch ||  || align=right data-sort-value="0.72" | 720 m || 
|-id=377 bgcolor=#fefefe
| 542377 ||  || — || February 1, 2013 || Kitt Peak || Spacewatch ||  || align=right data-sort-value="0.65" | 650 m || 
|-id=378 bgcolor=#C2FFFF
| 542378 ||  || — || January 10, 2013 || Haleakala || Pan-STARRS || L4 || align=right | 7.5 km || 
|-id=379 bgcolor=#fefefe
| 542379 ||  || — || October 4, 2007 || Mount Lemmon || Mount Lemmon Survey ||  || align=right data-sort-value="0.97" | 970 m || 
|-id=380 bgcolor=#E9E9E9
| 542380 ||  || — || February 1, 2009 || Mount Lemmon || Mount Lemmon Survey ||  || align=right | 1.2 km || 
|-id=381 bgcolor=#fefefe
| 542381 ||  || — || October 9, 2004 || Kitt Peak || Spacewatch || NYS || align=right data-sort-value="0.58" | 580 m || 
|-id=382 bgcolor=#fefefe
| 542382 ||  || — || March 9, 2002 || Palomar || NEAT ||  || align=right data-sort-value="0.79" | 790 m || 
|-id=383 bgcolor=#E9E9E9
| 542383 ||  || — || August 17, 2006 || Palomar || NEAT ||  || align=right | 2.3 km || 
|-id=384 bgcolor=#E9E9E9
| 542384 ||  || — || February 5, 2013 || Kitt Peak || Spacewatch ||  || align=right | 2.8 km || 
|-id=385 bgcolor=#d6d6d6
| 542385 ||  || — || October 22, 2006 || Mount Lemmon || Mount Lemmon Survey ||  || align=right | 4.1 km || 
|-id=386 bgcolor=#fefefe
| 542386 ||  || — || January 9, 2013 || Kitt Peak || Spacewatch || V || align=right data-sort-value="0.65" | 650 m || 
|-id=387 bgcolor=#d6d6d6
| 542387 ||  || — || December 9, 2006 || Kitt Peak || Spacewatch ||  || align=right | 2.4 km || 
|-id=388 bgcolor=#d6d6d6
| 542388 ||  || — || February 8, 2013 || Haleakala || Pan-STARRS ||  || align=right | 2.5 km || 
|-id=389 bgcolor=#d6d6d6
| 542389 ||  || — || August 27, 2005 || Palomar || NEAT ||  || align=right | 3.1 km || 
|-id=390 bgcolor=#E9E9E9
| 542390 ||  || — || March 11, 2005 || Mount Lemmon || Mount Lemmon Survey ||  || align=right | 1.1 km || 
|-id=391 bgcolor=#fefefe
| 542391 ||  || — || February 9, 2013 || Haleakala || Pan-STARRS || H || align=right data-sort-value="0.62" | 620 m || 
|-id=392 bgcolor=#fefefe
| 542392 ||  || — || August 24, 2003 || Cerro Tololo || Cerro Tololo Obs. ||  || align=right data-sort-value="0.98" | 980 m || 
|-id=393 bgcolor=#fefefe
| 542393 ||  || — || September 4, 2011 || Haleakala || Pan-STARRS ||  || align=right data-sort-value="0.72" | 720 m || 
|-id=394 bgcolor=#E9E9E9
| 542394 ||  || — || May 16, 2005 || Mount Lemmon || Mount Lemmon Survey ||  || align=right | 1.8 km || 
|-id=395 bgcolor=#E9E9E9
| 542395 ||  || — || February 8, 2013 || Haleakala || Pan-STARRS ||  || align=right | 1.5 km || 
|-id=396 bgcolor=#d6d6d6
| 542396 ||  || — || February 8, 2013 || Haleakala || Pan-STARRS ||  || align=right | 2.5 km || 
|-id=397 bgcolor=#d6d6d6
| 542397 ||  || — || February 8, 2008 || Kitt Peak || Spacewatch ||  || align=right | 2.0 km || 
|-id=398 bgcolor=#E9E9E9
| 542398 ||  || — || February 17, 2005 || La Silla || A. Boattini ||  || align=right data-sort-value="0.86" | 860 m || 
|-id=399 bgcolor=#C2FFFF
| 542399 ||  || — || September 23, 2008 || Kitt Peak || Spacewatch || L4ERY || align=right | 7.9 km || 
|-id=400 bgcolor=#d6d6d6
| 542400 ||  || — || January 17, 2007 || Kitt Peak || Spacewatch ||  || align=right | 3.0 km || 
|}

542401–542500 

|-bgcolor=#d6d6d6
| 542401 ||  || — || March 26, 2009 || Cerro Burek || Alianza S4 Obs. ||  || align=right | 3.6 km || 
|-id=402 bgcolor=#d6d6d6
| 542402 ||  || — || March 13, 2008 || Mount Lemmon || Mount Lemmon Survey ||  || align=right | 2.0 km || 
|-id=403 bgcolor=#E9E9E9
| 542403 ||  || — || July 27, 2001 || Anderson Mesa || LONEOS ||  || align=right | 2.7 km || 
|-id=404 bgcolor=#E9E9E9
| 542404 ||  || — || October 12, 2007 || Mount Lemmon || Mount Lemmon Survey ||  || align=right data-sort-value="0.88" | 880 m || 
|-id=405 bgcolor=#fefefe
| 542405 ||  || — || February 2, 2013 || Kitt Peak || Spacewatch || V || align=right data-sort-value="0.58" | 580 m || 
|-id=406 bgcolor=#fefefe
| 542406 ||  || — || January 18, 2013 || Kitt Peak || Spacewatch ||  || align=right data-sort-value="0.75" | 750 m || 
|-id=407 bgcolor=#E9E9E9
| 542407 ||  || — || April 18, 2009 || Mount Lemmon || Mount Lemmon Survey ||  || align=right | 1.5 km || 
|-id=408 bgcolor=#d6d6d6
| 542408 ||  || — || August 30, 2005 || Kitt Peak || Spacewatch ||  || align=right | 2.5 km || 
|-id=409 bgcolor=#E9E9E9
| 542409 ||  || — || September 4, 2010 || Hagen Obs. || J. Tiedtke, M. Klein ||  || align=right | 1.5 km || 
|-id=410 bgcolor=#fefefe
| 542410 ||  || — || January 19, 2013 || Kitt Peak || Spacewatch ||  || align=right data-sort-value="0.68" | 680 m || 
|-id=411 bgcolor=#E9E9E9
| 542411 ||  || — || August 19, 2002 || Palomar || NEAT || MAR || align=right | 1.3 km || 
|-id=412 bgcolor=#d6d6d6
| 542412 ||  || — || December 15, 2006 || Kitt Peak || Spacewatch ||  || align=right | 2.7 km || 
|-id=413 bgcolor=#fefefe
| 542413 ||  || — || January 13, 2013 || Catalina || CSS ||  || align=right | 1.0 km || 
|-id=414 bgcolor=#d6d6d6
| 542414 ||  || — || April 13, 2002 || Palomar || NEAT || EOS || align=right | 3.1 km || 
|-id=415 bgcolor=#d6d6d6
| 542415 ||  || — || August 25, 2005 || Palomar || NEAT || EOS || align=right | 2.0 km || 
|-id=416 bgcolor=#E9E9E9
| 542416 ||  || — || May 21, 2005 || Palomar || NEAT || EUN || align=right | 1.4 km || 
|-id=417 bgcolor=#E9E9E9
| 542417 ||  || — || September 25, 2006 || Mount Lemmon || Mount Lemmon Survey ||  || align=right | 2.1 km || 
|-id=418 bgcolor=#fefefe
| 542418 ||  || — || February 13, 2013 || ESA OGS || ESA OGS ||  || align=right data-sort-value="0.69" | 690 m || 
|-id=419 bgcolor=#fefefe
| 542419 ||  || — || October 19, 2011 || Kitt Peak || Spacewatch ||  || align=right data-sort-value="0.86" | 860 m || 
|-id=420 bgcolor=#E9E9E9
| 542420 ||  || — || February 6, 2013 || Elena Remote || A. Oreshko ||  || align=right | 1.0 km || 
|-id=421 bgcolor=#fefefe
| 542421 ||  || — || January 11, 2013 || Haleakala || Pan-STARRS || H || align=right data-sort-value="0.75" | 750 m || 
|-id=422 bgcolor=#d6d6d6
| 542422 ||  || — || August 4, 2008 || Siding Spring || SSS || Tj (2.99) || align=right | 3.4 km || 
|-id=423 bgcolor=#d6d6d6
| 542423 ||  || — || February 14, 2013 || Haleakala || Pan-STARRS ||  || align=right | 2.9 km || 
|-id=424 bgcolor=#E9E9E9
| 542424 ||  || — || November 21, 2003 || Palomar || NEAT ||  || align=right | 1.5 km || 
|-id=425 bgcolor=#fefefe
| 542425 ||  || — || October 31, 2005 || Mauna Kea || Mauna Kea Obs. ||  || align=right data-sort-value="0.82" | 820 m || 
|-id=426 bgcolor=#fefefe
| 542426 ||  || — || October 4, 2004 || Kitt Peak || Spacewatch ||  || align=right data-sort-value="0.94" | 940 m || 
|-id=427 bgcolor=#E9E9E9
| 542427 ||  || — || March 1, 2009 || Kitt Peak || Spacewatch ||  || align=right | 1.4 km || 
|-id=428 bgcolor=#fefefe
| 542428 ||  || — || February 14, 2013 || Kitt Peak || Spacewatch ||  || align=right data-sort-value="0.85" | 850 m || 
|-id=429 bgcolor=#E9E9E9
| 542429 ||  || — || August 19, 2006 || Kitt Peak || Spacewatch ||  || align=right | 2.4 km || 
|-id=430 bgcolor=#E9E9E9
| 542430 ||  || — || January 11, 2008 || Kitt Peak || Spacewatch ||  || align=right | 2.1 km || 
|-id=431 bgcolor=#fefefe
| 542431 ||  || — || February 4, 2006 || Catalina || CSS ||  || align=right data-sort-value="0.64" | 640 m || 
|-id=432 bgcolor=#fefefe
| 542432 ||  || — || February 14, 2013 || Kitt Peak || Spacewatch ||  || align=right data-sort-value="0.64" | 640 m || 
|-id=433 bgcolor=#fefefe
| 542433 ||  || — || October 11, 2004 || Kitt Peak || L. H. Wasserman, J. R. Lovering || MAS || align=right data-sort-value="0.75" | 750 m || 
|-id=434 bgcolor=#fefefe
| 542434 ||  || — || December 10, 2004 || Kitt Peak || Spacewatch ||  || align=right data-sort-value="0.82" | 820 m || 
|-id=435 bgcolor=#E9E9E9
| 542435 ||  || — || September 29, 2003 || Kitt Peak || Spacewatch ||  || align=right data-sort-value="0.77" | 770 m || 
|-id=436 bgcolor=#E9E9E9
| 542436 ||  || — || October 24, 2011 || Haleakala || Pan-STARRS ||  || align=right | 1.3 km || 
|-id=437 bgcolor=#E9E9E9
| 542437 ||  || — || September 11, 2002 || Palomar || NEAT ||  || align=right | 1.4 km || 
|-id=438 bgcolor=#d6d6d6
| 542438 ||  || — || February 14, 2013 || Haleakala || Pan-STARRS ||  || align=right | 2.2 km || 
|-id=439 bgcolor=#fefefe
| 542439 ||  || — || September 3, 2007 || Catalina || CSS ||  || align=right data-sort-value="0.89" | 890 m || 
|-id=440 bgcolor=#d6d6d6
| 542440 ||  || — || November 2, 2006 || Mount Lemmon || Mount Lemmon Survey ||  || align=right | 2.4 km || 
|-id=441 bgcolor=#E9E9E9
| 542441 ||  || — || January 13, 2008 || Kitt Peak || Spacewatch ||  || align=right | 2.2 km || 
|-id=442 bgcolor=#d6d6d6
| 542442 ||  || — || April 30, 2008 || Mount Lemmon || Mount Lemmon Survey ||  || align=right | 2.7 km || 
|-id=443 bgcolor=#d6d6d6
| 542443 ||  || — || January 27, 2007 || Mount Lemmon || Mount Lemmon Survey ||  || align=right | 3.5 km || 
|-id=444 bgcolor=#E9E9E9
| 542444 ||  || — || March 24, 2009 || Mount Lemmon || Mount Lemmon Survey || EUN || align=right | 1.5 km || 
|-id=445 bgcolor=#d6d6d6
| 542445 ||  || — || August 23, 2004 || Kitt Peak || Spacewatch ||  || align=right | 2.3 km || 
|-id=446 bgcolor=#d6d6d6
| 542446 ||  || — || August 6, 2005 || Palomar || NEAT ||  || align=right | 3.4 km || 
|-id=447 bgcolor=#E9E9E9
| 542447 ||  || — || October 24, 2011 || Kitt Peak || Spacewatch ||  || align=right | 1.9 km || 
|-id=448 bgcolor=#d6d6d6
| 542448 ||  || — || March 12, 2008 || Mount Lemmon || Mount Lemmon Survey ||  || align=right | 2.7 km || 
|-id=449 bgcolor=#fefefe
| 542449 ||  || — || January 8, 2013 || Kitt Peak || Spacewatch ||  || align=right data-sort-value="0.71" | 710 m || 
|-id=450 bgcolor=#fefefe
| 542450 ||  || — || December 3, 2005 || Mauna Kea || Mauna Kea Obs. ||  || align=right data-sort-value="0.84" | 840 m || 
|-id=451 bgcolor=#fefefe
| 542451 ||  || — || January 23, 2006 || Kitt Peak || Spacewatch ||  || align=right data-sort-value="0.71" | 710 m || 
|-id=452 bgcolor=#d6d6d6
| 542452 ||  || — || February 2, 2008 || Mount Lemmon || Mount Lemmon Survey ||  || align=right | 2.6 km || 
|-id=453 bgcolor=#fefefe
| 542453 ||  || — || February 28, 2006 || Mount Lemmon || Mount Lemmon Survey ||  || align=right | 1.0 km || 
|-id=454 bgcolor=#fefefe
| 542454 ||  || — || December 22, 2008 || Kitt Peak || Spacewatch ||  || align=right data-sort-value="0.79" | 790 m || 
|-id=455 bgcolor=#E9E9E9
| 542455 ||  || — || January 1, 2008 || Mount Lemmon || Mount Lemmon Survey ||  || align=right | 2.1 km || 
|-id=456 bgcolor=#fefefe
| 542456 ||  || — || February 7, 2013 || Nogales || M. Schwartz, P. R. Holvorcem ||  || align=right data-sort-value="0.86" | 860 m || 
|-id=457 bgcolor=#fefefe
| 542457 ||  || — || November 7, 2004 || Palomar || NEAT ||  || align=right data-sort-value="0.92" | 920 m || 
|-id=458 bgcolor=#d6d6d6
| 542458 ||  || — || May 22, 2001 || Cerro Tololo || J. L. Elliot, L. H. Wasserman ||  || align=right | 3.2 km || 
|-id=459 bgcolor=#d6d6d6
| 542459 ||  || — || February 12, 2013 || ESA OGS || ESA OGS || 3:2 || align=right | 4.8 km || 
|-id=460 bgcolor=#fefefe
| 542460 ||  || — || February 13, 2013 || ESA OGS || ESA OGS ||  || align=right data-sort-value="0.96" | 960 m || 
|-id=461 bgcolor=#d6d6d6
| 542461 Slovinský ||  ||  || October 3, 2010 || Piszkesteto || S. Kürti, K. Sárneczky ||  || align=right | 2.9 km || 
|-id=462 bgcolor=#fefefe
| 542462 ||  || — || January 19, 2013 || Kitt Peak || Spacewatch ||  || align=right data-sort-value="0.65" | 650 m || 
|-id=463 bgcolor=#d6d6d6
| 542463 ||  || — || October 7, 2005 || Mount Lemmon || Mount Lemmon Survey ||  || align=right | 2.2 km || 
|-id=464 bgcolor=#E9E9E9
| 542464 ||  || — || October 18, 2003 || Kitt Peak || Spacewatch ||  || align=right | 1.0 km || 
|-id=465 bgcolor=#fefefe
| 542465 ||  || — || December 31, 2008 || Kitt Peak || Spacewatch ||  || align=right | 1.0 km || 
|-id=466 bgcolor=#E9E9E9
| 542466 ||  || — || April 26, 2000 || Kitt Peak || Spacewatch ||  || align=right | 2.2 km || 
|-id=467 bgcolor=#E9E9E9
| 542467 ||  || — || March 19, 2009 || Kitt Peak || Spacewatch ||  || align=right | 2.1 km || 
|-id=468 bgcolor=#E9E9E9
| 542468 ||  || — || February 9, 2013 || Haleakala || Pan-STARRS ||  || align=right | 1.6 km || 
|-id=469 bgcolor=#E9E9E9
| 542469 ||  || — || January 18, 2013 || Mount Lemmon || Mount Lemmon Survey ||  || align=right | 1.4 km || 
|-id=470 bgcolor=#E9E9E9
| 542470 ||  || — || February 9, 2013 || Haleakala || Pan-STARRS ||  || align=right | 1.3 km || 
|-id=471 bgcolor=#fefefe
| 542471 ||  || — || January 20, 2009 || Kitt Peak || Spacewatch ||  || align=right data-sort-value="0.89" | 890 m || 
|-id=472 bgcolor=#fefefe
| 542472 ||  || — || January 23, 2006 || Mount Lemmon || Mount Lemmon Survey ||  || align=right data-sort-value="0.67" | 670 m || 
|-id=473 bgcolor=#E9E9E9
| 542473 ||  || — || August 20, 2006 || Palomar || NEAT ||  || align=right | 1.2 km || 
|-id=474 bgcolor=#fefefe
| 542474 ||  || — || March 24, 2006 || Kitt Peak || Spacewatch ||  || align=right data-sort-value="0.63" | 630 m || 
|-id=475 bgcolor=#E9E9E9
| 542475 ||  || — || November 18, 2007 || Mount Lemmon || Mount Lemmon Survey ||  || align=right | 2.3 km || 
|-id=476 bgcolor=#E9E9E9
| 542476 ||  || — || August 18, 2006 || Palomar || NEAT ||  || align=right | 3.2 km || 
|-id=477 bgcolor=#fefefe
| 542477 ||  || — || January 10, 2013 || Haleakala || Pan-STARRS ||  || align=right data-sort-value="0.78" | 780 m || 
|-id=478 bgcolor=#fefefe
| 542478 ||  || — || October 15, 2001 || Palomar || NEAT ||  || align=right data-sort-value="0.88" | 880 m || 
|-id=479 bgcolor=#E9E9E9
| 542479 ||  || — || December 5, 2007 || Kitt Peak || Spacewatch ||  || align=right | 2.4 km || 
|-id=480 bgcolor=#E9E9E9
| 542480 ||  || — || May 29, 2006 || Kitt Peak || Spacewatch ||  || align=right | 2.0 km || 
|-id=481 bgcolor=#d6d6d6
| 542481 ||  || — || February 8, 2013 || Haleakala || Pan-STARRS || KOR || align=right | 1.2 km || 
|-id=482 bgcolor=#d6d6d6
| 542482 ||  || — || February 8, 2013 || Haleakala || Pan-STARRS ||  || align=right | 2.5 km || 
|-id=483 bgcolor=#E9E9E9
| 542483 ||  || — || February 9, 2013 || Haleakala || Pan-STARRS ||  || align=right | 2.3 km || 
|-id=484 bgcolor=#E9E9E9
| 542484 ||  || — || November 5, 2007 || Kitt Peak || Spacewatch ||  || align=right data-sort-value="0.97" | 970 m || 
|-id=485 bgcolor=#fefefe
| 542485 ||  || — || December 31, 2008 || Kitt Peak || Spacewatch ||  || align=right data-sort-value="0.69" | 690 m || 
|-id=486 bgcolor=#E9E9E9
| 542486 ||  || — || September 7, 2011 || Kitt Peak || Spacewatch ||  || align=right data-sort-value="0.93" | 930 m || 
|-id=487 bgcolor=#fefefe
| 542487 ||  || — || January 3, 2009 || Kitt Peak || Spacewatch ||  || align=right data-sort-value="0.64" | 640 m || 
|-id=488 bgcolor=#fefefe
| 542488 ||  || — || March 1, 2009 || Kitt Peak || Spacewatch ||  || align=right data-sort-value="0.73" | 730 m || 
|-id=489 bgcolor=#E9E9E9
| 542489 ||  || — || September 28, 2001 || Palomar || NEAT ||  || align=right | 2.4 km || 
|-id=490 bgcolor=#E9E9E9
| 542490 ||  || — || October 2, 2006 || Mount Lemmon || Mount Lemmon Survey ||  || align=right | 2.2 km || 
|-id=491 bgcolor=#fefefe
| 542491 ||  || — || February 16, 2013 || Oukaimeden || C. Rinner ||  || align=right data-sort-value="0.90" | 900 m || 
|-id=492 bgcolor=#fefefe
| 542492 ||  || — || April 24, 2006 || Anderson Mesa || LONEOS || V || align=right data-sort-value="0.76" | 760 m || 
|-id=493 bgcolor=#fefefe
| 542493 ||  || — || October 4, 2011 || Piszkesteto || K. Sárneczky ||  || align=right data-sort-value="0.90" | 900 m || 
|-id=494 bgcolor=#d6d6d6
| 542494 ||  || — || August 31, 2005 || Palomar || NEAT ||  || align=right | 3.4 km || 
|-id=495 bgcolor=#fefefe
| 542495 ||  || — || October 19, 2000 || Kitt Peak || Spacewatch ||  || align=right data-sort-value="0.87" | 870 m || 
|-id=496 bgcolor=#E9E9E9
| 542496 ||  || — || October 29, 2002 || Kitt Peak || Spacewatch ||  || align=right | 1.7 km || 
|-id=497 bgcolor=#fefefe
| 542497 ||  || — || January 19, 2013 || Catalina || CSS ||  || align=right | 1.1 km || 
|-id=498 bgcolor=#d6d6d6
| 542498 ||  || — || August 7, 2010 || XuYi || PMO NEO ||  || align=right | 3.5 km || 
|-id=499 bgcolor=#fefefe
| 542499 ||  || — || February 5, 2013 || Nogales || M. Schwartz, P. R. Holvorcem ||  || align=right data-sort-value="0.87" | 870 m || 
|-id=500 bgcolor=#fefefe
| 542500 ||  || — || January 1, 2009 || Mount Lemmon || Mount Lemmon Survey ||  || align=right data-sort-value="0.82" | 820 m || 
|}

542501–542600 

|-bgcolor=#d6d6d6
| 542501 ||  || — || July 31, 2005 || Palomar || NEAT ||  || align=right | 3.0 km || 
|-id=502 bgcolor=#fefefe
| 542502 ||  || — || September 9, 2007 || Mount Lemmon || Mount Lemmon Survey || NYS || align=right data-sort-value="0.83" | 830 m || 
|-id=503 bgcolor=#d6d6d6
| 542503 ||  || — || August 22, 2004 || Kitt Peak || Spacewatch ||  || align=right | 3.2 km || 
|-id=504 bgcolor=#E9E9E9
| 542504 ||  || — || December 19, 2003 || Kitt Peak || Spacewatch ||  || align=right | 1.5 km || 
|-id=505 bgcolor=#fefefe
| 542505 ||  || — || April 15, 2008 || Mount Lemmon || Mount Lemmon Survey || H || align=right data-sort-value="0.57" | 570 m || 
|-id=506 bgcolor=#E9E9E9
| 542506 ||  || — || February 8, 2013 || Kitt Peak || Spacewatch ||  || align=right | 1.7 km || 
|-id=507 bgcolor=#fefefe
| 542507 ||  || — || January 9, 2013 || Mount Lemmon || Mount Lemmon Survey ||  || align=right data-sort-value="0.68" | 680 m || 
|-id=508 bgcolor=#fefefe
| 542508 ||  || — || March 30, 2008 || Catalina || CSS || H || align=right data-sort-value="0.65" | 650 m || 
|-id=509 bgcolor=#E9E9E9
| 542509 Lyatoshynsky ||  ||  || October 30, 2011 || Andrushivka || Y. Ivaščenko, P. Kyrylenko ||  || align=right | 1.2 km || 
|-id=510 bgcolor=#E9E9E9
| 542510 ||  || — || September 30, 2006 || Kitt Peak || Spacewatch ||  || align=right | 1.3 km || 
|-id=511 bgcolor=#E9E9E9
| 542511 ||  || — || August 29, 2006 || Kitt Peak || Spacewatch ||  || align=right | 2.0 km || 
|-id=512 bgcolor=#E9E9E9
| 542512 ||  || — || June 5, 2010 || ESA OGS || ESA OGS ||  || align=right | 1.4 km || 
|-id=513 bgcolor=#fefefe
| 542513 ||  || — || September 4, 2011 || Haleakala || Pan-STARRS ||  || align=right data-sort-value="0.91" | 910 m || 
|-id=514 bgcolor=#d6d6d6
| 542514 ||  || — || April 4, 2003 || Kitt Peak || Spacewatch ||  || align=right | 2.1 km || 
|-id=515 bgcolor=#E9E9E9
| 542515 ||  || — || June 16, 2001 || Palomar || NEAT ||  || align=right | 1.5 km || 
|-id=516 bgcolor=#d6d6d6
| 542516 ||  || — || August 25, 2005 || Palomar || NEAT ||  || align=right | 2.6 km || 
|-id=517 bgcolor=#E9E9E9
| 542517 ||  || — || October 10, 2002 || Kitt Peak || Spacewatch ||  || align=right | 1.0 km || 
|-id=518 bgcolor=#d6d6d6
| 542518 ||  || — || March 31, 2008 || Kitt Peak || Spacewatch ||  || align=right | 2.6 km || 
|-id=519 bgcolor=#fefefe
| 542519 ||  || — || April 13, 2002 || Palomar || NEAT ||  || align=right data-sort-value="0.89" | 890 m || 
|-id=520 bgcolor=#d6d6d6
| 542520 ||  || — || October 31, 2011 || Mount Lemmon || Mount Lemmon Survey || EOS || align=right | 1.8 km || 
|-id=521 bgcolor=#d6d6d6
| 542521 ||  || — || October 1, 2005 || Catalina || CSS ||  || align=right | 2.5 km || 
|-id=522 bgcolor=#fefefe
| 542522 ||  || — || November 18, 2008 || Kitt Peak || Spacewatch ||  || align=right data-sort-value="0.67" | 670 m || 
|-id=523 bgcolor=#E9E9E9
| 542523 ||  || — || March 3, 2009 || Mount Lemmon || Mount Lemmon Survey ||  || align=right | 1.1 km || 
|-id=524 bgcolor=#E9E9E9
| 542524 ||  || — || September 24, 2011 || Haleakala || Pan-STARRS ||  || align=right data-sort-value="0.89" | 890 m || 
|-id=525 bgcolor=#E9E9E9
| 542525 ||  || — || February 26, 2004 || Kitt Peak || M. W. Buie, D. E. Trilling ||  || align=right | 2.1 km || 
|-id=526 bgcolor=#d6d6d6
| 542526 ||  || — || September 17, 2010 || Mount Lemmon || Mount Lemmon Survey ||  || align=right | 3.1 km || 
|-id=527 bgcolor=#E9E9E9
| 542527 ||  || — || March 8, 2013 || Haleakala || Pan-STARRS ||  || align=right | 1.6 km || 
|-id=528 bgcolor=#d6d6d6
| 542528 ||  || — || October 6, 2004 || Kitt Peak || Spacewatch ||  || align=right | 2.7 km || 
|-id=529 bgcolor=#E9E9E9
| 542529 ||  || — || June 8, 2005 || Kitt Peak || Spacewatch ||  || align=right | 1.5 km || 
|-id=530 bgcolor=#E9E9E9
| 542530 ||  || — || April 11, 2004 || Palomar || NEAT ||  || align=right | 2.4 km || 
|-id=531 bgcolor=#fefefe
| 542531 ||  || — || February 14, 2013 || Haleakala || Pan-STARRS ||  || align=right data-sort-value="0.64" | 640 m || 
|-id=532 bgcolor=#fefefe
| 542532 ||  || — || May 7, 2006 || Mount Lemmon || Mount Lemmon Survey ||  || align=right data-sort-value="0.60" | 600 m || 
|-id=533 bgcolor=#E9E9E9
| 542533 ||  || — || August 19, 2006 || Kitt Peak || Spacewatch ||  || align=right | 1.5 km || 
|-id=534 bgcolor=#d6d6d6
| 542534 ||  || — || March 31, 2008 || Kitt Peak || Spacewatch ||  || align=right | 2.6 km || 
|-id=535 bgcolor=#d6d6d6
| 542535 ||  || — || February 15, 2013 || Haleakala || Pan-STARRS ||  || align=right | 2.1 km || 
|-id=536 bgcolor=#E9E9E9
| 542536 ||  || — || March 10, 2005 || Mount Lemmon || Mount Lemmon Survey ||  || align=right | 1.5 km || 
|-id=537 bgcolor=#E9E9E9
| 542537 ||  || — || September 15, 2002 || Palomar || NEAT ||  || align=right | 2.2 km || 
|-id=538 bgcolor=#fefefe
| 542538 ||  || — || September 10, 2007 || Mount Lemmon || Mount Lemmon Survey ||  || align=right data-sort-value="0.74" | 740 m || 
|-id=539 bgcolor=#E9E9E9
| 542539 ||  || — || April 4, 2005 || Mount Lemmon || Mount Lemmon Survey ||  || align=right data-sort-value="0.71" | 710 m || 
|-id=540 bgcolor=#fefefe
| 542540 ||  || — || February 9, 2002 || Kitt Peak || Spacewatch ||  || align=right data-sort-value="0.81" | 810 m || 
|-id=541 bgcolor=#fefefe
| 542541 ||  || — || January 20, 2009 || Kitt Peak || Spacewatch ||  || align=right data-sort-value="0.94" | 940 m || 
|-id=542 bgcolor=#E9E9E9
| 542542 ||  || — || September 14, 2006 || Eskridge || D. Tibbets ||  || align=right | 2.5 km || 
|-id=543 bgcolor=#E9E9E9
| 542543 ||  || — || April 15, 2004 || Palomar || NEAT ||  || align=right | 2.6 km || 
|-id=544 bgcolor=#d6d6d6
| 542544 ||  || — || February 19, 2013 || Kitt Peak || Spacewatch ||  || align=right | 2.8 km || 
|-id=545 bgcolor=#d6d6d6
| 542545 ||  || — || January 19, 2002 || Kitt Peak || Spacewatch ||  || align=right | 2.5 km || 
|-id=546 bgcolor=#d6d6d6
| 542546 ||  || — || October 26, 2011 || Haleakala || Pan-STARRS ||  || align=right | 2.5 km || 
|-id=547 bgcolor=#fefefe
| 542547 ||  || — || January 19, 1994 || Kitt Peak || Spacewatch ||  || align=right data-sort-value="0.99" | 990 m || 
|-id=548 bgcolor=#fefefe
| 542548 ||  || — || April 4, 2002 || Palomar || NEAT ||  || align=right | 1.2 km || 
|-id=549 bgcolor=#fefefe
| 542549 ||  || — || September 16, 2003 || Kitt Peak || Spacewatch ||  || align=right data-sort-value="0.90" | 900 m || 
|-id=550 bgcolor=#E9E9E9
| 542550 ||  || — || October 5, 2002 || Palomar || NEAT ||  || align=right | 1.9 km || 
|-id=551 bgcolor=#d6d6d6
| 542551 ||  || — || February 21, 2003 || Palomar || NEAT ||  || align=right | 3.4 km || 
|-id=552 bgcolor=#fefefe
| 542552 ||  || — || March 12, 2013 || Nogales || M. Schwartz, P. R. Holvorcem || H || align=right data-sort-value="0.73" | 730 m || 
|-id=553 bgcolor=#fefefe
| 542553 ||  || — || September 23, 2008 || Kitt Peak || Spacewatch ||  || align=right data-sort-value="0.60" | 600 m || 
|-id=554 bgcolor=#E9E9E9
| 542554 ||  || — || March 8, 2013 || Haleakala || Pan-STARRS ||  || align=right | 1.5 km || 
|-id=555 bgcolor=#E9E9E9
| 542555 ||  || — || September 25, 2005 || Kitt Peak || Spacewatch ||  || align=right | 2.4 km || 
|-id=556 bgcolor=#fefefe
| 542556 ||  || — || May 28, 2006 || Catalina || CSS ||  || align=right | 1.1 km || 
|-id=557 bgcolor=#E9E9E9
| 542557 ||  || — || October 18, 2007 || Kitt Peak || Spacewatch ||  || align=right data-sort-value="0.87" | 870 m || 
|-id=558 bgcolor=#fefefe
| 542558 ||  || — || January 8, 2013 || Kitt Peak || Spacewatch ||  || align=right data-sort-value="0.71" | 710 m || 
|-id=559 bgcolor=#fefefe
| 542559 ||  || — || August 1, 2011 || Haleakala || Pan-STARRS ||  || align=right | 1.2 km || 
|-id=560 bgcolor=#E9E9E9
| 542560 ||  || — || January 19, 2013 || Mount Lemmon || Mount Lemmon Survey ||  || align=right data-sort-value="0.83" | 830 m || 
|-id=561 bgcolor=#E9E9E9
| 542561 Ritajochen ||  ||  || March 12, 2013 || iTelescope || J. Jahn ||  || align=right | 1.3 km || 
|-id=562 bgcolor=#E9E9E9
| 542562 ||  || — || March 14, 2013 || Catalina || CSS ||  || align=right | 2.7 km || 
|-id=563 bgcolor=#E9E9E9
| 542563 ||  || — || December 21, 2003 || Kitt Peak || Spacewatch ||  || align=right | 1.7 km || 
|-id=564 bgcolor=#fefefe
| 542564 ||  || — || September 21, 2003 || Haleakala || AMOS ||  || align=right data-sort-value="0.98" | 980 m || 
|-id=565 bgcolor=#E9E9E9
| 542565 ||  || — || October 5, 2002 || Palomar || NEAT ||  || align=right | 1.7 km || 
|-id=566 bgcolor=#E9E9E9
| 542566 ||  || — || April 1, 2005 || Anderson Mesa || LONEOS ||  || align=right | 1.3 km || 
|-id=567 bgcolor=#E9E9E9
| 542567 ||  || — || March 11, 2005 || Kitt Peak || Spacewatch ||  || align=right | 1.3 km || 
|-id=568 bgcolor=#E9E9E9
| 542568 ||  || — || November 24, 2006 || Mauna Kea || Mauna Kea Obs. ||  || align=right | 2.0 km || 
|-id=569 bgcolor=#E9E9E9
| 542569 ||  || — || May 23, 2001 || Cerro Tololo || J. L. Elliot, L. H. Wasserman ||  || align=right | 2.2 km || 
|-id=570 bgcolor=#E9E9E9
| 542570 ||  || — || March 5, 2013 || Haleakala || Pan-STARRS ||  || align=right | 1.3 km || 
|-id=571 bgcolor=#fefefe
| 542571 ||  || — || September 26, 2011 || Haleakala || Pan-STARRS ||  || align=right data-sort-value="0.74" | 740 m || 
|-id=572 bgcolor=#d6d6d6
| 542572 ||  || — || March 4, 2013 || Haleakala || Pan-STARRS ||  || align=right | 3.5 km || 
|-id=573 bgcolor=#fefefe
| 542573 ||  || — || April 25, 2006 || Mount Lemmon || Mount Lemmon Survey ||  || align=right data-sort-value="0.80" | 800 m || 
|-id=574 bgcolor=#fefefe
| 542574 ||  || — || June 19, 2006 || Mount Lemmon || Mount Lemmon Survey ||  || align=right data-sort-value="0.86" | 860 m || 
|-id=575 bgcolor=#fefefe
| 542575 ||  || — || December 23, 2008 || Dauban || C. Rinner, F. Kugel ||  || align=right data-sort-value="0.78" | 780 m || 
|-id=576 bgcolor=#fefefe
| 542576 ||  || — || November 19, 2003 || Palomar || NEAT ||  || align=right | 1.4 km || 
|-id=577 bgcolor=#fefefe
| 542577 ||  || — || September 24, 2011 || Haleakala || Pan-STARRS || V || align=right data-sort-value="0.63" | 630 m || 
|-id=578 bgcolor=#fefefe
| 542578 ||  || — || March 14, 2013 || Catalina || CSS ||  || align=right data-sort-value="0.86" | 860 m || 
|-id=579 bgcolor=#d6d6d6
| 542579 ||  || — || October 14, 2010 || Mount Lemmon || Mount Lemmon Survey || 7:4 || align=right | 3.7 km || 
|-id=580 bgcolor=#E9E9E9
| 542580 ||  || — || September 18, 2006 || Kitt Peak || Spacewatch ||  || align=right | 1.1 km || 
|-id=581 bgcolor=#d6d6d6
| 542581 ||  || — || March 28, 2008 || Mount Lemmon || Mount Lemmon Survey ||  || align=right | 2.7 km || 
|-id=582 bgcolor=#fefefe
| 542582 ||  || — || January 1, 2009 || Mount Lemmon || Mount Lemmon Survey ||  || align=right data-sort-value="0.87" | 870 m || 
|-id=583 bgcolor=#d6d6d6
| 542583 ||  || — || October 19, 1995 || Kitt Peak || Spacewatch ||  || align=right | 2.4 km || 
|-id=584 bgcolor=#E9E9E9
| 542584 ||  || — || March 5, 2013 || Haleakala || Pan-STARRS ||  || align=right | 2.4 km || 
|-id=585 bgcolor=#E9E9E9
| 542585 ||  || — || March 15, 2013 || Kitt Peak || Spacewatch ||  || align=right | 1.8 km || 
|-id=586 bgcolor=#fefefe
| 542586 ||  || — || October 24, 2011 || Haleakala || Pan-STARRS ||  || align=right data-sort-value="0.68" | 680 m || 
|-id=587 bgcolor=#E9E9E9
| 542587 ||  || — || November 7, 2002 || Kitt Peak || Kitt Peak Obs. ||  || align=right | 2.2 km || 
|-id=588 bgcolor=#E9E9E9
| 542588 ||  || — || November 30, 2011 || Kitt Peak || Spacewatch ||  || align=right | 2.5 km || 
|-id=589 bgcolor=#d6d6d6
| 542589 ||  || — || January 10, 2007 || Mount Lemmon || Mount Lemmon Survey ||  || align=right | 3.5 km || 
|-id=590 bgcolor=#d6d6d6
| 542590 ||  || — || January 27, 2007 || Kitt Peak || Spacewatch ||  || align=right | 3.7 km || 
|-id=591 bgcolor=#E9E9E9
| 542591 ||  || — || May 4, 2005 || Catalina || CSS ||  || align=right | 1.0 km || 
|-id=592 bgcolor=#E9E9E9
| 542592 ||  || — || April 19, 2009 || Mount Lemmon || Mount Lemmon Survey ||  || align=right | 2.3 km || 
|-id=593 bgcolor=#fefefe
| 542593 ||  || — || July 28, 2011 || Siding Spring || SSS || H || align=right data-sort-value="0.64" | 640 m || 
|-id=594 bgcolor=#E9E9E9
| 542594 ||  || — || March 19, 2013 || Palomar || PTF ||  || align=right | 1.7 km || 
|-id=595 bgcolor=#E9E9E9
| 542595 ||  || — || December 21, 2011 || Crni Vrh || J. Skvarč ||  || align=right | 1.8 km || 
|-id=596 bgcolor=#E9E9E9
| 542596 ||  || — || July 3, 2005 || Palomar || NEAT ||  || align=right | 1.9 km || 
|-id=597 bgcolor=#E9E9E9
| 542597 ||  || — || April 10, 2004 || Palomar || NEAT ||  || align=right | 2.6 km || 
|-id=598 bgcolor=#d6d6d6
| 542598 ||  || — || March 5, 2013 || Kitt Peak || Spacewatch ||  || align=right | 3.0 km || 
|-id=599 bgcolor=#E9E9E9
| 542599 ||  || — || January 20, 2013 || Mount Graham || C. W. Hergenrother ||  || align=right | 1.3 km || 
|-id=600 bgcolor=#E9E9E9
| 542600 Lindahall ||  ||  || April 16, 2005 || Vail-Jarnac || T. Glinos, D. H. Levy || ADE || align=right | 2.3 km || 
|}

542601–542700 

|-bgcolor=#E9E9E9
| 542601 ||  || — || March 19, 2013 || Haleakala || Pan-STARRS ||  || align=right data-sort-value="0.82" | 820 m || 
|-id=602 bgcolor=#E9E9E9
| 542602 ||  || — || May 19, 2005 || Palomar || NEAT ||  || align=right data-sort-value="0.97" | 970 m || 
|-id=603 bgcolor=#E9E9E9
| 542603 ||  || — || March 31, 2013 || Mount Lemmon || Mount Lemmon Survey ||  || align=right | 2.3 km || 
|-id=604 bgcolor=#fefefe
| 542604 ||  || — || March 13, 2002 || Palomar || NEAT ||  || align=right data-sort-value="0.93" | 930 m || 
|-id=605 bgcolor=#E9E9E9
| 542605 ||  || — || March 14, 2013 || Kitt Peak || Spacewatch ||  || align=right | 2.1 km || 
|-id=606 bgcolor=#E9E9E9
| 542606 ||  || — || May 29, 2009 || Mount Lemmon || Mount Lemmon Survey ||  || align=right | 1.5 km || 
|-id=607 bgcolor=#d6d6d6
| 542607 ||  || — || March 10, 2007 || Mount Lemmon || Mount Lemmon Survey ||  || align=right | 3.3 km || 
|-id=608 bgcolor=#E9E9E9
| 542608 ||  || — || March 13, 2013 || Haleakala || Pan-STARRS ||  || align=right data-sort-value="0.75" | 750 m || 
|-id=609 bgcolor=#FA8072
| 542609 ||  || — || September 21, 2006 || Anderson Mesa || LONEOS || H || align=right data-sort-value="0.64" | 640 m || 
|-id=610 bgcolor=#fefefe
| 542610 ||  || — || February 14, 2005 || Kitt Peak || Spacewatch ||  || align=right data-sort-value="0.69" | 690 m || 
|-id=611 bgcolor=#E9E9E9
| 542611 ||  || — || February 26, 2008 || Mount Lemmon || Mount Lemmon Survey ||  || align=right | 1.9 km || 
|-id=612 bgcolor=#d6d6d6
| 542612 ||  || — || April 2, 2013 || Kitt Peak || Spacewatch ||  || align=right | 2.2 km || 
|-id=613 bgcolor=#d6d6d6
| 542613 ||  || — || August 13, 2004 || Cerro Tololo || Cerro Tololo Obs. ||  || align=right | 3.3 km || 
|-id=614 bgcolor=#fefefe
| 542614 ||  || — || April 3, 2013 || Palomar || PTF ||  || align=right data-sort-value="0.95" | 950 m || 
|-id=615 bgcolor=#d6d6d6
| 542615 ||  || — || February 9, 2007 || Catalina || CSS ||  || align=right | 3.6 km || 
|-id=616 bgcolor=#E9E9E9
| 542616 ||  || — || March 12, 2013 || Nogales || M. Schwartz, P. R. Holvorcem ||  || align=right | 1.8 km || 
|-id=617 bgcolor=#fefefe
| 542617 ||  || — || April 25, 2006 || Mount Lemmon || Mount Lemmon Survey || NYS || align=right data-sort-value="0.54" | 540 m || 
|-id=618 bgcolor=#fefefe
| 542618 ||  || — || December 14, 2007 || Dauban || C. Rinner, F. Kugel ||  || align=right | 1.3 km || 
|-id=619 bgcolor=#d6d6d6
| 542619 ||  || — || April 5, 2013 || Palomar || PTF ||  || align=right | 2.9 km || 
|-id=620 bgcolor=#E9E9E9
| 542620 ||  || — || August 27, 2006 || Kitt Peak || Spacewatch ||  || align=right | 1.1 km || 
|-id=621 bgcolor=#fefefe
| 542621 ||  || — || April 7, 2013 || Haleakala || Pan-STARRS || H || align=right data-sort-value="0.41" | 410 m || 
|-id=622 bgcolor=#d6d6d6
| 542622 ||  || — || August 30, 2005 || Kitt Peak || Spacewatch ||  || align=right | 3.6 km || 
|-id=623 bgcolor=#E9E9E9
| 542623 ||  || — || December 30, 2011 || Mount Lemmon || Mount Lemmon Survey ||  || align=right | 2.5 km || 
|-id=624 bgcolor=#fefefe
| 542624 ||  || — || October 31, 2005 || Mauna Kea || Mauna Kea Obs. ||  || align=right data-sort-value="0.78" | 780 m || 
|-id=625 bgcolor=#E9E9E9
| 542625 ||  || — || July 18, 2005 || Palomar || NEAT ||  || align=right | 2.3 km || 
|-id=626 bgcolor=#d6d6d6
| 542626 ||  || — || July 3, 2003 || Kitt Peak || Spacewatch ||  || align=right | 2.6 km || 
|-id=627 bgcolor=#FA8072
| 542627 ||  || — || November 2, 2004 || Anderson Mesa || LONEOS ||  || align=right data-sort-value="0.80" | 800 m || 
|-id=628 bgcolor=#E9E9E9
| 542628 ||  || — || October 24, 2011 || Haleakala || Pan-STARRS ||  || align=right data-sort-value="0.73" | 730 m || 
|-id=629 bgcolor=#E9E9E9
| 542629 ||  || — || October 19, 2001 || Palomar || NEAT ||  || align=right | 2.5 km || 
|-id=630 bgcolor=#E9E9E9
| 542630 ||  || — || May 13, 2005 || Siding Spring || SSS ||  || align=right | 1.5 km || 
|-id=631 bgcolor=#d6d6d6
| 542631 ||  || — || May 6, 2008 || Mount Lemmon || Mount Lemmon Survey ||  || align=right | 2.6 km || 
|-id=632 bgcolor=#E9E9E9
| 542632 ||  || — || October 2, 2006 || Mount Lemmon || Mount Lemmon Survey ||  || align=right | 1.2 km || 
|-id=633 bgcolor=#E9E9E9
| 542633 ||  || — || August 18, 2006 || Palomar || NEAT ||  || align=right | 1.5 km || 
|-id=634 bgcolor=#fefefe
| 542634 ||  || — || September 13, 2007 || Mount Lemmon || Mount Lemmon Survey ||  || align=right data-sort-value="0.75" | 750 m || 
|-id=635 bgcolor=#fefefe
| 542635 ||  || — || April 5, 2003 || Kitt Peak || Spacewatch ||  || align=right data-sort-value="0.88" | 880 m || 
|-id=636 bgcolor=#d6d6d6
| 542636 ||  || — || August 22, 2003 || Palomar || NEAT || HYG || align=right | 3.4 km || 
|-id=637 bgcolor=#E9E9E9
| 542637 ||  || — || October 2, 2006 || Mount Lemmon || Mount Lemmon Survey ||  || align=right | 1.6 km || 
|-id=638 bgcolor=#d6d6d6
| 542638 ||  || — || August 25, 2005 || Palomar || NEAT ||  || align=right | 2.5 km || 
|-id=639 bgcolor=#E9E9E9
| 542639 ||  || — || September 19, 2006 || Kitt Peak || Spacewatch ||  || align=right | 1.2 km || 
|-id=640 bgcolor=#fefefe
| 542640 ||  || — || October 26, 2011 || Haleakala || Pan-STARRS ||  || align=right data-sort-value="0.78" | 780 m || 
|-id=641 bgcolor=#fefefe
| 542641 ||  || — || November 3, 2007 || Mount Lemmon || Mount Lemmon Survey ||  || align=right data-sort-value="0.84" | 840 m || 
|-id=642 bgcolor=#fefefe
| 542642 ||  || — || April 13, 2002 || Palomar || NEAT ||  || align=right data-sort-value="0.89" | 890 m || 
|-id=643 bgcolor=#E9E9E9
| 542643 ||  || — || February 11, 2008 || Mount Lemmon || Mount Lemmon Survey ||  || align=right | 2.2 km || 
|-id=644 bgcolor=#E9E9E9
| 542644 ||  || — || August 29, 2006 || Kitt Peak || Spacewatch ||  || align=right | 1.0 km || 
|-id=645 bgcolor=#E9E9E9
| 542645 ||  || — || April 6, 2013 || Mount Lemmon || Mount Lemmon Survey ||  || align=right | 1.0 km || 
|-id=646 bgcolor=#E9E9E9
| 542646 ||  || — || April 20, 2010 || WISE || WISE ||  || align=right | 1.1 km || 
|-id=647 bgcolor=#d6d6d6
| 542647 ||  || — || April 27, 2008 || Mount Lemmon || Mount Lemmon Survey ||  || align=right | 2.2 km || 
|-id=648 bgcolor=#fefefe
| 542648 ||  || — || January 28, 2009 || Catalina || CSS || (5026) || align=right data-sort-value="0.71" | 710 m || 
|-id=649 bgcolor=#fefefe
| 542649 ||  || — || April 7, 2013 || Mount Lemmon || Mount Lemmon Survey ||  || align=right data-sort-value="0.58" | 580 m || 
|-id=650 bgcolor=#E9E9E9
| 542650 ||  || — || October 9, 2010 || Mount Lemmon || Mount Lemmon Survey ||  || align=right | 1.3 km || 
|-id=651 bgcolor=#fefefe
| 542651 ||  || — || December 4, 2008 || Kitt Peak || Spacewatch ||  || align=right data-sort-value="0.85" | 850 m || 
|-id=652 bgcolor=#d6d6d6
| 542652 ||  || — || December 2, 2010 || Mount Lemmon || Mount Lemmon Survey ||  || align=right | 2.7 km || 
|-id=653 bgcolor=#d6d6d6
| 542653 ||  || — || October 12, 2010 || Mount Lemmon || Mount Lemmon Survey ||  || align=right | 2.8 km || 
|-id=654 bgcolor=#E9E9E9
| 542654 ||  || — || September 2, 2010 || Mount Lemmon || Mount Lemmon Survey ||  || align=right | 1.2 km || 
|-id=655 bgcolor=#d6d6d6
| 542655 ||  || — || June 3, 2008 || Mount Lemmon || Mount Lemmon Survey ||  || align=right | 2.9 km || 
|-id=656 bgcolor=#E9E9E9
| 542656 ||  || — || April 14, 2005 || Kitt Peak || Spacewatch ||  || align=right | 1.1 km || 
|-id=657 bgcolor=#d6d6d6
| 542657 ||  || — || April 8, 2013 || Mount Lemmon || Mount Lemmon Survey ||  || align=right | 3.1 km || 
|-id=658 bgcolor=#E9E9E9
| 542658 ||  || — || April 10, 2013 || Haleakala || Pan-STARRS ||  || align=right data-sort-value="0.78" | 780 m || 
|-id=659 bgcolor=#fefefe
| 542659 ||  || — || April 13, 2013 || Haleakala || Pan-STARRS || H || align=right data-sort-value="0.67" | 670 m || 
|-id=660 bgcolor=#d6d6d6
| 542660 ||  || — || December 5, 2005 || Kitt Peak || Spacewatch ||  || align=right | 2.3 km || 
|-id=661 bgcolor=#d6d6d6
| 542661 ||  || — || April 12, 2013 || Haleakala || Pan-STARRS ||  || align=right | 3.0 km || 
|-id=662 bgcolor=#E9E9E9
| 542662 ||  || — || August 4, 2005 || Palomar || NEAT ||  || align=right | 3.1 km || 
|-id=663 bgcolor=#E9E9E9
| 542663 ||  || — || May 11, 2005 || Palomar || NEAT ||  || align=right | 1.2 km || 
|-id=664 bgcolor=#E9E9E9
| 542664 ||  || — || August 31, 2005 || Palomar || NEAT ||  || align=right | 2.8 km || 
|-id=665 bgcolor=#d6d6d6
| 542665 ||  || — || April 11, 2002 || Palomar || NEAT ||  || align=right | 4.9 km || 
|-id=666 bgcolor=#d6d6d6
| 542666 ||  || — || January 3, 2012 || Mount Lemmon || Mount Lemmon Survey ||  || align=right | 3.1 km || 
|-id=667 bgcolor=#E9E9E9
| 542667 ||  || — || July 6, 2005 || Reedy Creek || J. Broughton || EUN || align=right | 1.9 km || 
|-id=668 bgcolor=#d6d6d6
| 542668 ||  || — || October 28, 2010 || Mount Lemmon || Mount Lemmon Survey ||  || align=right | 3.6 km || 
|-id=669 bgcolor=#E9E9E9
| 542669 ||  || — || November 1, 2010 || Bisei SG Center || K. Nishiyama, T. Sakamoto ||  || align=right | 1.3 km || 
|-id=670 bgcolor=#E9E9E9
| 542670 ||  || — || April 14, 2004 || Kitt Peak || Spacewatch ||  || align=right | 2.0 km || 
|-id=671 bgcolor=#d6d6d6
| 542671 ||  || — || April 14, 2013 || Palomar || PTF ||  || align=right | 2.9 km || 
|-id=672 bgcolor=#d6d6d6
| 542672 ||  || — || January 14, 2012 || Kitt Peak || Spacewatch ||  || align=right | 2.6 km || 
|-id=673 bgcolor=#fefefe
| 542673 ||  || — || November 2, 2007 || Mount Lemmon || Mount Lemmon Survey ||  || align=right data-sort-value="0.82" | 820 m || 
|-id=674 bgcolor=#E9E9E9
| 542674 ||  || — || August 27, 2005 || Palomar || NEAT || PAD || align=right | 1.9 km || 
|-id=675 bgcolor=#FA8072
| 542675 ||  || — || April 14, 2002 || Palomar || NEAT ||  || align=right data-sort-value="0.67" | 670 m || 
|-id=676 bgcolor=#d6d6d6
| 542676 ||  || — || April 8, 2002 || Palomar || NEAT ||  || align=right | 4.4 km || 
|-id=677 bgcolor=#fefefe
| 542677 ||  || — || December 1, 2005 || Kitt Peak || L. H. Wasserman, R. Millis ||  || align=right data-sort-value="0.79" | 790 m || 
|-id=678 bgcolor=#d6d6d6
| 542678 ||  || — || April 11, 2013 || Mount Lemmon || Mount Lemmon Survey || 3:2 || align=right | 5.0 km || 
|-id=679 bgcolor=#fefefe
| 542679 ||  || — || April 12, 2013 || Haleakala || Pan-STARRS ||  || align=right | 1.1 km || 
|-id=680 bgcolor=#E9E9E9
| 542680 ||  || — || December 25, 2011 || Piszkesteto || K. Sárneczky || EUN || align=right | 1.3 km || 
|-id=681 bgcolor=#d6d6d6
| 542681 ||  || — || October 31, 2010 || Mount Lemmon || Mount Lemmon Survey || EOS || align=right | 2.2 km || 
|-id=682 bgcolor=#fefefe
| 542682 ||  || — || January 17, 2001 || Kitt Peak || Spacewatch ||  || align=right | 1.2 km || 
|-id=683 bgcolor=#E9E9E9
| 542683 ||  || — || May 19, 2005 || Siding Spring || SSS ||  || align=right | 1.2 km || 
|-id=684 bgcolor=#d6d6d6
| 542684 ||  || — || May 7, 2002 || Anderson Mesa || LONEOS ||  || align=right | 3.7 km || 
|-id=685 bgcolor=#E9E9E9
| 542685 ||  || — || November 6, 2010 || Mount Lemmon || Mount Lemmon Survey ||  || align=right | 2.2 km || 
|-id=686 bgcolor=#E9E9E9
| 542686 ||  || — || May 10, 2005 || Mount Lemmon || Mount Lemmon Survey ||  || align=right data-sort-value="0.83" | 830 m || 
|-id=687 bgcolor=#E9E9E9
| 542687 ||  || — || August 19, 2006 || Kitt Peak || Spacewatch ||  || align=right | 1.3 km || 
|-id=688 bgcolor=#d6d6d6
| 542688 ||  || — || March 11, 2002 || Palomar || NEAT ||  || align=right | 4.1 km || 
|-id=689 bgcolor=#E9E9E9
| 542689 ||  || — || February 15, 2004 || Catalina || CSS ||  || align=right | 1.7 km || 
|-id=690 bgcolor=#d6d6d6
| 542690 ||  || — || April 9, 2003 || Kitt Peak || Spacewatch ||  || align=right | 2.7 km || 
|-id=691 bgcolor=#d6d6d6
| 542691 ||  || — || January 20, 2012 || Mount Lemmon || Mount Lemmon Survey ||  || align=right | 3.8 km || 
|-id=692 bgcolor=#d6d6d6
| 542692 ||  || — || April 12, 2002 || Kitt Peak || Spacewatch || EOS || align=right | 2.4 km || 
|-id=693 bgcolor=#fefefe
| 542693 ||  || — || December 2, 2005 || Mauna Kea || Mauna Kea Obs. ||  || align=right data-sort-value="0.75" | 750 m || 
|-id=694 bgcolor=#E9E9E9
| 542694 ||  || — || October 12, 1999 || Kitt Peak || Spacewatch ||  || align=right data-sort-value="0.81" | 810 m || 
|-id=695 bgcolor=#E9E9E9
| 542695 ||  || — || April 13, 2013 || Haleakala || Pan-STARRS ||  || align=right | 2.1 km || 
|-id=696 bgcolor=#E9E9E9
| 542696 ||  || — || July 5, 2005 || Mount Lemmon || Mount Lemmon Survey ||  || align=right | 2.1 km || 
|-id=697 bgcolor=#E9E9E9
| 542697 ||  || — || April 8, 2013 || Mount Lemmon || Mount Lemmon Survey ||  || align=right | 1.1 km || 
|-id=698 bgcolor=#E9E9E9
| 542698 ||  || — || April 8, 2013 || Mount Lemmon || Mount Lemmon Survey ||  || align=right | 1.8 km || 
|-id=699 bgcolor=#E9E9E9
| 542699 ||  || — || March 18, 2013 || Kitt Peak || Spacewatch ||  || align=right | 1.2 km || 
|-id=700 bgcolor=#E9E9E9
| 542700 ||  || — || March 19, 2013 || Kitt Peak || Spacewatch ||  || align=right | 2.1 km || 
|}

542701–542800 

|-bgcolor=#fefefe
| 542701 ||  || — || April 14, 2013 || Mount Lemmon || Mount Lemmon Survey ||  || align=right data-sort-value="0.79" | 790 m || 
|-id=702 bgcolor=#d6d6d6
| 542702 ||  || — || April 4, 2002 || Palomar || NEAT ||  || align=right | 4.3 km || 
|-id=703 bgcolor=#E9E9E9
| 542703 ||  || — || March 5, 2013 || Haleakala || Pan-STARRS ||  || align=right | 1.0 km || 
|-id=704 bgcolor=#E9E9E9
| 542704 ||  || — || July 21, 2006 || Mount Lemmon || Mount Lemmon Survey ||  || align=right | 1.1 km || 
|-id=705 bgcolor=#fefefe
| 542705 ||  || — || October 20, 2007 || Mount Lemmon || Mount Lemmon Survey ||  || align=right data-sort-value="0.85" | 850 m || 
|-id=706 bgcolor=#d6d6d6
| 542706 ||  || — || April 15, 2008 || Mount Lemmon || Mount Lemmon Survey ||  || align=right | 2.6 km || 
|-id=707 bgcolor=#E9E9E9
| 542707 ||  || — || July 29, 2005 || Palomar || NEAT ||  || align=right | 2.2 km || 
|-id=708 bgcolor=#E9E9E9
| 542708 ||  || — || April 8, 2013 || Mount Lemmon || Mount Lemmon Survey ||  || align=right | 1.7 km || 
|-id=709 bgcolor=#d6d6d6
| 542709 ||  || — || March 5, 2013 || Haleakala || Pan-STARRS ||  || align=right | 3.0 km || 
|-id=710 bgcolor=#E9E9E9
| 542710 ||  || — || April 11, 2013 || Kitt Peak || Spacewatch ||  || align=right | 2.2 km || 
|-id=711 bgcolor=#E9E9E9
| 542711 ||  || — || April 15, 2013 || Haleakala || Pan-STARRS ||  || align=right | 1.4 km || 
|-id=712 bgcolor=#E9E9E9
| 542712 ||  || — || February 13, 2008 || Kitt Peak || Spacewatch ||  || align=right | 1.7 km || 
|-id=713 bgcolor=#E9E9E9
| 542713 ||  || — || October 17, 2010 || Mount Lemmon || Mount Lemmon Survey ||  || align=right | 2.5 km || 
|-id=714 bgcolor=#E9E9E9
| 542714 ||  || — || April 10, 2013 || Haleakala || Pan-STARRS ||  || align=right data-sort-value="0.70" | 700 m || 
|-id=715 bgcolor=#fefefe
| 542715 ||  || — || April 5, 2013 || Haleakala || Pan-STARRS ||  || align=right data-sort-value="0.82" | 820 m || 
|-id=716 bgcolor=#d6d6d6
| 542716 ||  || — || March 16, 2007 || Kitt Peak || Spacewatch ||  || align=right | 2.8 km || 
|-id=717 bgcolor=#E9E9E9
| 542717 ||  || — || July 29, 2005 || Palomar || NEAT ||  || align=right | 2.0 km || 
|-id=718 bgcolor=#E9E9E9
| 542718 ||  || — || January 2, 2012 || Mount Lemmon || Mount Lemmon Survey ||  || align=right | 1.6 km || 
|-id=719 bgcolor=#d6d6d6
| 542719 ||  || — || September 15, 2009 || Mount Lemmon || Mount Lemmon Survey ||  || align=right | 3.1 km || 
|-id=720 bgcolor=#d6d6d6
| 542720 ||  || — || January 28, 2007 || Mount Lemmon || Mount Lemmon Survey ||  || align=right | 3.2 km || 
|-id=721 bgcolor=#d6d6d6
| 542721 ||  || — || April 14, 2013 || Mount Lemmon || Mount Lemmon Survey ||  || align=right | 2.6 km || 
|-id=722 bgcolor=#d6d6d6
| 542722 ||  || — || April 18, 2013 || Palomar || PTF ||  || align=right | 2.9 km || 
|-id=723 bgcolor=#d6d6d6
| 542723 ||  || — || March 31, 2008 || Mount Lemmon || Mount Lemmon Survey ||  || align=right | 3.1 km || 
|-id=724 bgcolor=#E9E9E9
| 542724 ||  || — || April 8, 2013 || Kitt Peak || Spacewatch ||  || align=right | 1.1 km || 
|-id=725 bgcolor=#E9E9E9
| 542725 ||  || — || April 29, 2009 || Kitt Peak || Spacewatch ||  || align=right | 2.0 km || 
|-id=726 bgcolor=#d6d6d6
| 542726 ||  || — || May 6, 2002 || Palomar || NEAT ||  || align=right | 4.3 km || 
|-id=727 bgcolor=#E9E9E9
| 542727 ||  || — || May 1, 2004 || Kitt Peak || Spacewatch ||  || align=right | 2.7 km || 
|-id=728 bgcolor=#E9E9E9
| 542728 ||  || — || October 28, 2011 || Mount Lemmon || Mount Lemmon Survey ||  || align=right | 1.6 km || 
|-id=729 bgcolor=#fefefe
| 542729 ||  || — || April 13, 2013 || Kitt Peak || Spacewatch || H || align=right data-sort-value="0.68" | 680 m || 
|-id=730 bgcolor=#E9E9E9
| 542730 ||  || — || August 18, 2001 || Palomar || NEAT ||  || align=right | 2.2 km || 
|-id=731 bgcolor=#E9E9E9
| 542731 ||  || — || August 4, 2005 || Palomar || NEAT ||  || align=right | 3.1 km || 
|-id=732 bgcolor=#E9E9E9
| 542732 ||  || — || September 20, 2006 || Kitt Peak || Spacewatch ||  || align=right | 1.4 km || 
|-id=733 bgcolor=#E9E9E9
| 542733 ||  || — || February 7, 2008 || Mount Lemmon || Mount Lemmon Survey ||  || align=right | 1.8 km || 
|-id=734 bgcolor=#fefefe
| 542734 ||  || — || March 19, 2013 || Haleakala || Pan-STARRS || H || align=right data-sort-value="0.49" | 490 m || 
|-id=735 bgcolor=#E9E9E9
| 542735 ||  || — || April 9, 2013 || Haleakala || Pan-STARRS ||  || align=right | 1.5 km || 
|-id=736 bgcolor=#E9E9E9
| 542736 ||  || — || December 19, 2007 || Mount Lemmon || Mount Lemmon Survey ||  || align=right | 1.9 km || 
|-id=737 bgcolor=#E9E9E9
| 542737 ||  || — || September 18, 2006 || Kitt Peak || Spacewatch ||  || align=right | 1.5 km || 
|-id=738 bgcolor=#fefefe
| 542738 ||  || — || September 27, 2006 || Mount Lemmon || Mount Lemmon Survey || H || align=right data-sort-value="0.53" | 530 m || 
|-id=739 bgcolor=#E9E9E9
| 542739 ||  || — || April 12, 2013 || Nogales || M. Schwartz, P. R. Holvorcem ||  || align=right | 1.7 km || 
|-id=740 bgcolor=#E9E9E9
| 542740 ||  || — || April 20, 2013 || Mount Lemmon || Mount Lemmon Survey ||  || align=right data-sort-value="0.87" | 870 m || 
|-id=741 bgcolor=#E9E9E9
| 542741 ||  || — || January 1, 2012 || Mount Lemmon || Mount Lemmon Survey ||  || align=right | 1.9 km || 
|-id=742 bgcolor=#d6d6d6
| 542742 ||  || — || February 26, 2012 || La Palma || La Palma Obs. || TIR || align=right | 3.3 km || 
|-id=743 bgcolor=#d6d6d6
| 542743 ||  || — || July 8, 2003 || Kitt Peak || Spacewatch ||  || align=right | 3.8 km || 
|-id=744 bgcolor=#fefefe
| 542744 ||  || — || October 1, 2011 || Kitt Peak || Spacewatch ||  || align=right data-sort-value="0.66" | 660 m || 
|-id=745 bgcolor=#E9E9E9
| 542745 ||  || — || August 28, 2006 || Kitt Peak || Spacewatch ||  || align=right | 1.0 km || 
|-id=746 bgcolor=#d6d6d6
| 542746 ||  || — || September 18, 2003 || Palomar || NEAT ||  || align=right | 3.3 km || 
|-id=747 bgcolor=#E9E9E9
| 542747 ||  || — || August 19, 2001 || Cerro Tololo || Cerro Tololo Obs. ||  || align=right | 1.2 km || 
|-id=748 bgcolor=#fefefe
| 542748 ||  || — || September 15, 2003 || Palomar || NEAT ||  || align=right data-sort-value="0.98" | 980 m || 
|-id=749 bgcolor=#E9E9E9
| 542749 ||  || — || April 9, 2013 || Haleakala || Pan-STARRS ||  || align=right | 1.4 km || 
|-id=750 bgcolor=#d6d6d6
| 542750 ||  || — || September 15, 2009 || Catalina || CSS ||  || align=right | 2.5 km || 
|-id=751 bgcolor=#E9E9E9
| 542751 ||  || — || April 9, 2013 || Haleakala || Pan-STARRS ||  || align=right data-sort-value="0.82" | 820 m || 
|-id=752 bgcolor=#E9E9E9
| 542752 ||  || — || August 28, 2006 || Lulin || LUSS ||  || align=right | 1.5 km || 
|-id=753 bgcolor=#d6d6d6
| 542753 ||  || — || April 18, 2013 || Cerro Tololo-DECam || CTIO-DECam ||  || align=right | 1.9 km || 
|-id=754 bgcolor=#d6d6d6
| 542754 ||  || — || October 8, 2005 || Moletai || K. Černis, J. Zdanavičius ||  || align=right | 2.3 km || 
|-id=755 bgcolor=#E9E9E9
| 542755 ||  || — || September 12, 2010 || Mount Lemmon || Mount Lemmon Survey ||  || align=right | 1.3 km || 
|-id=756 bgcolor=#fefefe
| 542756 ||  || — || April 30, 2013 || Mount Lemmon || Mount Lemmon Survey || H || align=right data-sort-value="0.50" | 500 m || 
|-id=757 bgcolor=#E9E9E9
| 542757 ||  || — || October 17, 2006 || Kitt Peak || Spacewatch ||  || align=right | 1.1 km || 
|-id=758 bgcolor=#E9E9E9
| 542758 ||  || — || October 10, 2010 || Mount Lemmon || Mount Lemmon Survey ||  || align=right | 1.1 km || 
|-id=759 bgcolor=#E9E9E9
| 542759 ||  || — || April 9, 2013 || Haleakala || Pan-STARRS ||  || align=right | 1.9 km || 
|-id=760 bgcolor=#d6d6d6
| 542760 ||  || — || September 16, 2010 || Mount Lemmon || Mount Lemmon Survey ||  || align=right | 2.5 km || 
|-id=761 bgcolor=#E9E9E9
| 542761 ||  || — || April 15, 2013 || Calar Alto || F. Hormuth ||  || align=right data-sort-value="0.72" | 720 m || 
|-id=762 bgcolor=#E9E9E9
| 542762 ||  || — || November 23, 2006 || Mount Lemmon || Mount Lemmon Survey ||  || align=right | 1.6 km || 
|-id=763 bgcolor=#E9E9E9
| 542763 ||  || — || November 20, 2006 || Kitt Peak || Spacewatch ||  || align=right | 1.9 km || 
|-id=764 bgcolor=#E9E9E9
| 542764 ||  || — || October 25, 2003 || Kitt Peak || Spacewatch ||  || align=right data-sort-value="0.71" | 710 m || 
|-id=765 bgcolor=#E9E9E9
| 542765 ||  || — || March 26, 2009 || Kitt Peak || Spacewatch ||  || align=right data-sort-value="0.82" | 820 m || 
|-id=766 bgcolor=#fefefe
| 542766 ||  || — || October 22, 2011 || Mount Lemmon || Mount Lemmon Survey ||  || align=right data-sort-value="0.64" | 640 m || 
|-id=767 bgcolor=#E9E9E9
| 542767 ||  || — || September 14, 2006 || Kitt Peak || Spacewatch ||  || align=right | 1.3 km || 
|-id=768 bgcolor=#d6d6d6
| 542768 ||  || — || September 17, 2010 || Mount Lemmon || Mount Lemmon Survey ||  || align=right | 2.4 km || 
|-id=769 bgcolor=#E9E9E9
| 542769 ||  || — || October 7, 2001 || Palomar || NEAT ||  || align=right | 1.9 km || 
|-id=770 bgcolor=#E9E9E9
| 542770 ||  || — || April 16, 2013 || Siding Spring || SSS ||  || align=right data-sort-value="0.94" | 940 m || 
|-id=771 bgcolor=#d6d6d6
| 542771 ||  || — || August 22, 2004 || Kitt Peak || Spacewatch ||  || align=right | 2.4 km || 
|-id=772 bgcolor=#E9E9E9
| 542772 ||  || — || November 2, 2007 || Mount Lemmon || Mount Lemmon Survey ||  || align=right | 1.2 km || 
|-id=773 bgcolor=#d6d6d6
| 542773 ||  || — || October 1, 2005 || Mount Lemmon || Mount Lemmon Survey || KOR || align=right | 1.1 km || 
|-id=774 bgcolor=#E9E9E9
| 542774 ||  || — || September 25, 2006 || Mount Lemmon || Mount Lemmon Survey ||  || align=right | 1.1 km || 
|-id=775 bgcolor=#d6d6d6
| 542775 ||  || — || October 21, 1997 || Kitt Peak || Spacewatch || 7:4 || align=right | 3.2 km || 
|-id=776 bgcolor=#E9E9E9
| 542776 ||  || — || April 2, 2013 || Mount Lemmon || Mount Lemmon Survey ||  || align=right | 1.3 km || 
|-id=777 bgcolor=#E9E9E9
| 542777 ||  || — || June 11, 2005 || Kitt Peak || Spacewatch ||  || align=right data-sort-value="0.90" | 900 m || 
|-id=778 bgcolor=#fefefe
| 542778 ||  || — || March 12, 2013 || Mount Lemmon || Mount Lemmon Survey || H || align=right data-sort-value="0.62" | 620 m || 
|-id=779 bgcolor=#d6d6d6
| 542779 ||  || — || November 20, 2006 || Mount Lemmon || Mount Lemmon Survey ||  || align=right | 4.1 km || 
|-id=780 bgcolor=#fefefe
| 542780 ||  || — || December 13, 2006 || Kitt Peak || Spacewatch || H || align=right data-sort-value="0.81" | 810 m || 
|-id=781 bgcolor=#E9E9E9
| 542781 ||  || — || April 16, 2013 || Siding Spring || SSS ||  || align=right | 1.1 km || 
|-id=782 bgcolor=#d6d6d6
| 542782 ||  || — || May 1, 2013 || Mount Lemmon || Mount Lemmon Survey ||  || align=right | 2.8 km || 
|-id=783 bgcolor=#fefefe
| 542783 ||  || — || October 27, 2006 || Mount Lemmon || Mount Lemmon Survey || H || align=right data-sort-value="0.59" | 590 m || 
|-id=784 bgcolor=#E9E9E9
| 542784 ||  || — || May 1, 2009 || Mount Lemmon || Mount Lemmon Survey ||  || align=right data-sort-value="0.89" | 890 m || 
|-id=785 bgcolor=#fefefe
| 542785 ||  || — || March 18, 2013 || Palomar || PTF || H || align=right data-sort-value="0.86" | 860 m || 
|-id=786 bgcolor=#E9E9E9
| 542786 ||  || — || December 18, 2003 || Kitt Peak || Spacewatch ||  || align=right | 1.2 km || 
|-id=787 bgcolor=#E9E9E9
| 542787 ||  || — || March 14, 2008 || Mount Lemmon || Mount Lemmon Survey ||  || align=right | 1.4 km || 
|-id=788 bgcolor=#fefefe
| 542788 ||  || — || October 19, 2011 || Mount Lemmon || Mount Lemmon Survey || H || align=right data-sort-value="0.57" | 570 m || 
|-id=789 bgcolor=#C2FFFF
| 542789 ||  || — || October 30, 2009 || Mount Lemmon || Mount Lemmon Survey || L4 || align=right | 9.1 km || 
|-id=790 bgcolor=#fefefe
| 542790 ||  || — || May 10, 2013 || Haleakala || Pan-STARRS || H || align=right data-sort-value="0.49" | 490 m || 
|-id=791 bgcolor=#fefefe
| 542791 ||  || — || September 25, 2003 || Gnosca || S. Sposetti ||  || align=right data-sort-value="0.72" | 720 m || 
|-id=792 bgcolor=#E9E9E9
| 542792 ||  || — || May 10, 2013 || Kitt Peak || Spacewatch ||  || align=right | 1.6 km || 
|-id=793 bgcolor=#E9E9E9
| 542793 ||  || — || May 10, 2013 || Elena Remote || A. Oreshko ||  || align=right | 1.0 km || 
|-id=794 bgcolor=#E9E9E9
| 542794 ||  || — || August 26, 2005 || Palomar || NEAT ||  || align=right | 3.2 km || 
|-id=795 bgcolor=#d6d6d6
| 542795 ||  || — || April 12, 2002 || Palomar || NEAT ||  || align=right | 4.4 km || 
|-id=796 bgcolor=#E9E9E9
| 542796 ||  || — || March 15, 2013 || Mount Lemmon || Mount Lemmon Survey ||  || align=right | 1.8 km || 
|-id=797 bgcolor=#E9E9E9
| 542797 ||  || — || July 1, 2001 || Palomar || NEAT ||  || align=right | 1.6 km || 
|-id=798 bgcolor=#E9E9E9
| 542798 ||  || — || May 12, 2013 || Kitt Peak || Spacewatch ||  || align=right | 2.1 km || 
|-id=799 bgcolor=#fefefe
| 542799 ||  || — || June 3, 2005 || Kitt Peak || Spacewatch || H || align=right data-sort-value="0.68" | 680 m || 
|-id=800 bgcolor=#d6d6d6
| 542800 ||  || — || October 12, 2004 || Moletai || K. Černis, J. Zdanavičius ||  || align=right | 3.9 km || 
|}

542801–542900 

|-bgcolor=#fefefe
| 542801 ||  || — || September 26, 2011 || Kitt Peak || Spacewatch || H || align=right data-sort-value="0.65" | 650 m || 
|-id=802 bgcolor=#d6d6d6
| 542802 ||  || — || April 19, 2013 || Haleakala || Pan-STARRS ||  || align=right | 2.4 km || 
|-id=803 bgcolor=#d6d6d6
| 542803 ||  || — || December 1, 2005 || Kitt Peak || L. H. Wasserman, R. Millis ||  || align=right | 3.6 km || 
|-id=804 bgcolor=#d6d6d6
| 542804 ||  || — || January 11, 2011 || Mount Lemmon || Mount Lemmon Survey ||  || align=right | 2.6 km || 
|-id=805 bgcolor=#d6d6d6
| 542805 ||  || — || January 19, 2012 || Kitt Peak || Spacewatch ||  || align=right | 2.9 km || 
|-id=806 bgcolor=#d6d6d6
| 542806 ||  || — || May 11, 2013 || Mount Lemmon || Mount Lemmon Survey ||  || align=right | 2.2 km || 
|-id=807 bgcolor=#E9E9E9
| 542807 ||  || — || August 1, 2005 || Siding Spring || SSS || ADE || align=right | 2.1 km || 
|-id=808 bgcolor=#E9E9E9
| 542808 ||  || — || April 16, 2013 || Haleakala || Pan-STARRS ||  || align=right | 1.4 km || 
|-id=809 bgcolor=#E9E9E9
| 542809 ||  || — || April 7, 2013 || Mount Lemmon || Mount Lemmon Survey ||  || align=right | 1.4 km || 
|-id=810 bgcolor=#E9E9E9
| 542810 ||  || — || May 12, 2013 || Kitt Peak || Spacewatch ||  || align=right | 1.1 km || 
|-id=811 bgcolor=#E9E9E9
| 542811 ||  || — || July 27, 2005 || Palomar || NEAT ||  || align=right | 2.4 km || 
|-id=812 bgcolor=#fefefe
| 542812 ||  || — || May 14, 2013 || Nogales || M. Schwartz, P. R. Holvorcem ||  || align=right data-sort-value="0.73" | 730 m || 
|-id=813 bgcolor=#d6d6d6
| 542813 ||  || — || November 14, 2010 || Mount Lemmon || Mount Lemmon Survey ||  || align=right | 3.0 km || 
|-id=814 bgcolor=#fefefe
| 542814 ||  || — || March 3, 2009 || Mount Lemmon || Mount Lemmon Survey ||  || align=right data-sort-value="0.70" | 700 m || 
|-id=815 bgcolor=#d6d6d6
| 542815 ||  || — || March 13, 2007 || Mount Lemmon || Mount Lemmon Survey ||  || align=right | 2.7 km || 
|-id=816 bgcolor=#E9E9E9
| 542816 ||  || — || November 9, 2010 || Mount Lemmon || Mount Lemmon Survey ||  || align=right | 2.0 km || 
|-id=817 bgcolor=#d6d6d6
| 542817 ||  || — || November 10, 2010 || Mount Lemmon || Mount Lemmon Survey ||  || align=right | 3.0 km || 
|-id=818 bgcolor=#fefefe
| 542818 ||  || — || September 28, 2003 || Kitt Peak || Spacewatch ||  || align=right data-sort-value="0.96" | 960 m || 
|-id=819 bgcolor=#E9E9E9
| 542819 ||  || — || January 2, 2012 || Kitt Peak || Spacewatch ||  || align=right | 1.3 km || 
|-id=820 bgcolor=#E9E9E9
| 542820 ||  || — || March 11, 2008 || Kitt Peak || Spacewatch ||  || align=right | 1.7 km || 
|-id=821 bgcolor=#E9E9E9
| 542821 ||  || — || April 7, 2008 || Mount Lemmon || Mount Lemmon Survey ||  || align=right | 2.3 km || 
|-id=822 bgcolor=#E9E9E9
| 542822 ||  || — || October 2, 2006 || Mount Lemmon || Mount Lemmon Survey ||  || align=right | 1.4 km || 
|-id=823 bgcolor=#E9E9E9
| 542823 ||  || — || May 8, 2013 || Haleakala || Pan-STARRS ||  || align=right | 1.2 km || 
|-id=824 bgcolor=#d6d6d6
| 542824 ||  || — || January 24, 2012 || Haleakala || Pan-STARRS ||  || align=right | 3.6 km || 
|-id=825 bgcolor=#E9E9E9
| 542825 ||  || — || October 22, 2011 || Mount Lemmon || Mount Lemmon Survey ||  || align=right | 2.6 km || 
|-id=826 bgcolor=#d6d6d6
| 542826 ||  || — || April 21, 2002 || Palomar || NEAT ||  || align=right | 4.0 km || 
|-id=827 bgcolor=#E9E9E9
| 542827 ||  || — || May 2, 2013 || Kitt Peak || Spacewatch ||  || align=right | 1.9 km || 
|-id=828 bgcolor=#E9E9E9
| 542828 ||  || — || May 15, 2013 || Haleakala || Pan-STARRS ||  || align=right | 1.6 km || 
|-id=829 bgcolor=#E9E9E9
| 542829 ||  || — || August 19, 2001 || Cerro Tololo || Cerro Tololo Obs. ||  || align=right | 1.7 km || 
|-id=830 bgcolor=#d6d6d6
| 542830 ||  || — || May 17, 2013 || Mount Lemmon || Mount Lemmon Survey ||  || align=right | 4.1 km || 
|-id=831 bgcolor=#FA8072
| 542831 ||  || — || May 28, 2008 || Mount Lemmon || Mount Lemmon Survey || H || align=right data-sort-value="0.60" | 600 m || 
|-id=832 bgcolor=#E9E9E9
| 542832 ||  || — || May 16, 2013 || Mount Lemmon || Mount Lemmon Survey ||  || align=right | 1.0 km || 
|-id=833 bgcolor=#E9E9E9
| 542833 ||  || — || December 4, 2002 || Kitt Peak || Kitt Peak Obs. ||  || align=right | 1.1 km || 
|-id=834 bgcolor=#E9E9E9
| 542834 ||  || — || July 18, 2001 || Palomar || NEAT ||  || align=right | 1.4 km || 
|-id=835 bgcolor=#fefefe
| 542835 ||  || — || October 25, 2011 || Haleakala || Pan-STARRS || H || align=right data-sort-value="0.73" | 730 m || 
|-id=836 bgcolor=#E9E9E9
| 542836 ||  || — || May 31, 2013 || Nogales || M. Schwartz, P. R. Holvorcem ||  || align=right | 1.3 km || 
|-id=837 bgcolor=#E9E9E9
| 542837 ||  || — || July 28, 2001 || Anderson Mesa || LONEOS ||  || align=right | 1.1 km || 
|-id=838 bgcolor=#d6d6d6
| 542838 ||  || — || May 31, 2013 || Mount Lemmon || Mount Lemmon Survey ||  || align=right | 3.1 km || 
|-id=839 bgcolor=#d6d6d6
| 542839 ||  || — || March 11, 2007 || Kitt Peak || Spacewatch ||  || align=right | 2.5 km || 
|-id=840 bgcolor=#d6d6d6
| 542840 ||  || — || November 19, 2004 || Anderson Mesa || LONEOS ||  || align=right | 4.6 km || 
|-id=841 bgcolor=#d6d6d6
| 542841 ||  || — || May 18, 2002 || Palomar || NEAT ||  || align=right | 3.7 km || 
|-id=842 bgcolor=#d6d6d6
| 542842 ||  || — || January 20, 2012 || Kitt Peak || Spacewatch ||  || align=right | 2.9 km || 
|-id=843 bgcolor=#E9E9E9
| 542843 ||  || — || May 16, 2013 || Haleakala || Pan-STARRS ||  || align=right | 2.3 km || 
|-id=844 bgcolor=#d6d6d6
| 542844 ||  || — || December 6, 2005 || Kitt Peak || Spacewatch ||  || align=right | 2.6 km || 
|-id=845 bgcolor=#fefefe
| 542845 ||  || — || September 18, 2003 || Palomar || NEAT ||  || align=right data-sort-value="0.69" | 690 m || 
|-id=846 bgcolor=#d6d6d6
| 542846 ||  || — || September 4, 2003 || Kitt Peak || Spacewatch ||  || align=right | 2.9 km || 
|-id=847 bgcolor=#d6d6d6
| 542847 ||  || — || May 31, 2013 || Haleakala || Pan-STARRS ||  || align=right | 2.8 km || 
|-id=848 bgcolor=#d6d6d6
| 542848 ||  || — || May 31, 2013 || Mount Lemmon || Mount Lemmon Survey ||  || align=right | 2.9 km || 
|-id=849 bgcolor=#d6d6d6
| 542849 ||  || — || May 22, 2013 || Mount Lemmon || Mount Lemmon Survey ||  || align=right | 4.0 km || 
|-id=850 bgcolor=#E9E9E9
| 542850 ||  || — || June 1, 2013 || Kitt Peak || Spacewatch ||  || align=right | 1.4 km || 
|-id=851 bgcolor=#fefefe
| 542851 ||  || — || March 30, 2003 || Anderson Mesa || LONEOS ||  || align=right data-sort-value="0.74" | 740 m || 
|-id=852 bgcolor=#fefefe
| 542852 ||  || — || October 30, 2007 || Kitt Peak || Spacewatch ||  || align=right data-sort-value="0.86" | 860 m || 
|-id=853 bgcolor=#E9E9E9
| 542853 ||  || — || July 22, 2001 || Palomar || NEAT ||  || align=right | 1.2 km || 
|-id=854 bgcolor=#fefefe
| 542854 ||  || — || November 18, 2008 || Kitt Peak || Spacewatch || H || align=right data-sort-value="0.74" | 740 m || 
|-id=855 bgcolor=#E9E9E9
| 542855 ||  || — || February 23, 2012 || Mount Lemmon || Mount Lemmon Survey ||  || align=right | 1.1 km || 
|-id=856 bgcolor=#E9E9E9
| 542856 ||  || — || June 29, 2005 || Palomar || NEAT ||  || align=right | 1.7 km || 
|-id=857 bgcolor=#d6d6d6
| 542857 ||  || — || December 23, 2006 || Mauna Kea || Mauna Kea Obs. ||  || align=right | 2.4 km || 
|-id=858 bgcolor=#E9E9E9
| 542858 ||  || — || January 2, 2012 || Kitt Peak || Spacewatch ||  || align=right | 1.9 km || 
|-id=859 bgcolor=#E9E9E9
| 542859 ||  || — || August 17, 2001 || Palomar || NEAT || EUN || align=right | 1.2 km || 
|-id=860 bgcolor=#E9E9E9
| 542860 ||  || — || August 27, 2006 || Kitt Peak || Spacewatch ||  || align=right | 1.0 km || 
|-id=861 bgcolor=#d6d6d6
| 542861 ||  || — || December 26, 2011 || Mount Lemmon || Mount Lemmon Survey ||  || align=right | 3.0 km || 
|-id=862 bgcolor=#d6d6d6
| 542862 ||  || — || November 8, 2010 || Mount Lemmon || Mount Lemmon Survey ||  || align=right | 2.7 km || 
|-id=863 bgcolor=#fefefe
| 542863 ||  || — || October 16, 2003 || Kitt Peak || Spacewatch ||  || align=right data-sort-value="0.88" | 880 m || 
|-id=864 bgcolor=#E9E9E9
| 542864 ||  || — || June 23, 2005 || Palomar || NEAT ||  || align=right | 1.7 km || 
|-id=865 bgcolor=#E9E9E9
| 542865 ||  || — || October 4, 2005 || Mount Lemmon || Mount Lemmon Survey ||  || align=right | 2.3 km || 
|-id=866 bgcolor=#fefefe
| 542866 ||  || — || June 9, 2006 || Palomar || NEAT ||  || align=right data-sort-value="0.92" | 920 m || 
|-id=867 bgcolor=#E9E9E9
| 542867 ||  || — || January 27, 2004 || Kitt Peak || Spacewatch ||  || align=right | 1.1 km || 
|-id=868 bgcolor=#E9E9E9
| 542868 ||  || — || April 23, 2009 || Mount Lemmon || Mount Lemmon Survey ||  || align=right | 1.4 km || 
|-id=869 bgcolor=#E9E9E9
| 542869 ||  || — || November 3, 2010 || Mount Lemmon || Mount Lemmon Survey ||  || align=right | 1.7 km || 
|-id=870 bgcolor=#fefefe
| 542870 ||  || — || November 25, 2011 || Haleakala || Pan-STARRS || H || align=right data-sort-value="0.59" | 590 m || 
|-id=871 bgcolor=#fefefe
| 542871 ||  || — || May 17, 2005 || Mount Lemmon || Mount Lemmon Survey || H || align=right data-sort-value="0.63" | 630 m || 
|-id=872 bgcolor=#E9E9E9
| 542872 ||  || — || June 12, 2013 || Kitt Peak || Spacewatch ||  || align=right | 1.00 km || 
|-id=873 bgcolor=#d6d6d6
| 542873 ||  || — || June 13, 2013 || Catalina || CSS ||  || align=right | 3.4 km || 
|-id=874 bgcolor=#E9E9E9
| 542874 ||  || — || May 16, 2013 || Haleakala || Pan-STARRS ||  || align=right | 2.6 km || 
|-id=875 bgcolor=#d6d6d6
| 542875 ||  || — || September 30, 2003 || Kitt Peak || Spacewatch ||  || align=right | 3.3 km || 
|-id=876 bgcolor=#E9E9E9
| 542876 ||  || — || April 17, 2013 || Nogales || M. Schwartz, P. R. Holvorcem ||  || align=right | 1.9 km || 
|-id=877 bgcolor=#d6d6d6
| 542877 ||  || — || June 6, 2013 || Mount Lemmon || Mount Lemmon Survey ||  || align=right | 3.3 km || 
|-id=878 bgcolor=#d6d6d6
| 542878 ||  || — || December 10, 2010 || Mount Lemmon || Mount Lemmon Survey ||  || align=right | 2.6 km || 
|-id=879 bgcolor=#d6d6d6
| 542879 ||  || — || May 11, 2013 || Kitt Peak || Spacewatch ||  || align=right | 2.9 km || 
|-id=880 bgcolor=#E9E9E9
| 542880 ||  || — || February 24, 2012 || Mount Lemmon || Mount Lemmon Survey ||  || align=right | 1.8 km || 
|-id=881 bgcolor=#fefefe
| 542881 ||  || — || September 25, 2006 || Kitt Peak || Spacewatch ||  || align=right data-sort-value="0.81" | 810 m || 
|-id=882 bgcolor=#E9E9E9
| 542882 ||  || — || September 30, 2005 || Catalina || CSS ||  || align=right | 1.3 km || 
|-id=883 bgcolor=#fefefe
| 542883 ||  || — || October 11, 2010 || Mount Lemmon || Mount Lemmon Survey ||  || align=right data-sort-value="0.70" | 700 m || 
|-id=884 bgcolor=#E9E9E9
| 542884 ||  || — || June 3, 2013 || Mount Lemmon || Mount Lemmon Survey ||  || align=right | 1.9 km || 
|-id=885 bgcolor=#fefefe
| 542885 ||  || — || June 18, 2013 || Haleakala || Pan-STARRS ||  || align=right data-sort-value="0.71" | 710 m || 
|-id=886 bgcolor=#E9E9E9
| 542886 ||  || — || June 12, 2013 || Haleakala || Pan-STARRS ||  || align=right | 1.9 km || 
|-id=887 bgcolor=#E9E9E9
| 542887 ||  || — || August 29, 2005 || Palomar || NEAT ||  || align=right | 1.2 km || 
|-id=888 bgcolor=#E9E9E9
| 542888 Confino ||  ||  || June 10, 2013 || Oukaimeden || M. Ory ||  || align=right | 1.1 km || 
|-id=889 bgcolor=#C2E0FF
| 542889 ||  || — || July 29, 2014 || Haleakala || Pan-STARRS || centaur || align=right | 88 km || 
|-id=890 bgcolor=#fefefe
| 542890 ||  || — || July 1, 2013 || Haleakala || Pan-STARRS || H || align=right data-sort-value="0.65" | 650 m || 
|-id=891 bgcolor=#d6d6d6
| 542891 ||  || — || March 13, 2007 || Mount Lemmon || Mount Lemmon Survey ||  || align=right | 2.4 km || 
|-id=892 bgcolor=#d6d6d6
| 542892 ||  || — || December 10, 2010 || Mount Lemmon || Mount Lemmon Survey ||  || align=right | 2.5 km || 
|-id=893 bgcolor=#E9E9E9
| 542893 ||  || — || January 20, 2012 || Haleakala || Pan-STARRS ||  || align=right | 2.1 km || 
|-id=894 bgcolor=#E9E9E9
| 542894 ||  || — || June 18, 2013 || Haleakala || Pan-STARRS ||  || align=right | 2.1 km || 
|-id=895 bgcolor=#fefefe
| 542895 ||  || — || December 24, 2006 || Mount Lemmon || Mount Lemmon Survey || H || align=right data-sort-value="0.69" | 690 m || 
|-id=896 bgcolor=#d6d6d6
| 542896 ||  || — || September 3, 2008 || Kitt Peak || Spacewatch ||  || align=right | 2.3 km || 
|-id=897 bgcolor=#fefefe
| 542897 ||  || — || April 13, 2010 || Catalina || CSS || H || align=right data-sort-value="0.86" | 860 m || 
|-id=898 bgcolor=#E9E9E9
| 542898 ||  || — || April 4, 2003 || Kitt Peak || Spacewatch ||  || align=right | 3.1 km || 
|-id=899 bgcolor=#d6d6d6
| 542899 ||  || — || July 13, 2013 || Elena Remote || A. Oreshko ||  || align=right | 2.0 km || 
|-id=900 bgcolor=#E9E9E9
| 542900 ||  || — || April 1, 2012 || Haleakala || Pan-STARRS ||  || align=right | 1.7 km || 
|}

542901–543000 

|-bgcolor=#d6d6d6
| 542901 ||  || — || July 14, 2013 || Haleakala || Pan-STARRS ||  || align=right | 2.5 km || 
|-id=902 bgcolor=#E9E9E9
| 542902 ||  || — || October 20, 1995 || Kitt Peak || Spacewatch ||  || align=right | 2.2 km || 
|-id=903 bgcolor=#E9E9E9
| 542903 ||  || — || October 10, 2004 || Kitt Peak || Spacewatch ||  || align=right | 1.9 km || 
|-id=904 bgcolor=#d6d6d6
| 542904 ||  || — || July 14, 2013 || Haleakala || Pan-STARRS ||  || align=right | 1.9 km || 
|-id=905 bgcolor=#E9E9E9
| 542905 ||  || — || August 27, 2009 || Kitt Peak || Spacewatch ||  || align=right data-sort-value="0.80" | 800 m || 
|-id=906 bgcolor=#fefefe
| 542906 ||  || — || June 28, 2005 || Palomar || NEAT || H || align=right data-sort-value="0.76" | 760 m || 
|-id=907 bgcolor=#fefefe
| 542907 ||  || — || March 19, 2007 || Mount Lemmon || Mount Lemmon Survey || H || align=right data-sort-value="0.69" | 690 m || 
|-id=908 bgcolor=#E9E9E9
| 542908 ||  || — || December 9, 2010 || Mount Lemmon || Mount Lemmon Survey || MAR || align=right | 1.5 km || 
|-id=909 bgcolor=#d6d6d6
| 542909 ||  || — || July 10, 2002 || Palomar || NEAT ||  || align=right | 2.9 km || 
|-id=910 bgcolor=#d6d6d6
| 542910 ||  || — || July 28, 2013 || Crni Vrh || B. Mikuž ||  || align=right | 2.9 km || 
|-id=911 bgcolor=#d6d6d6
| 542911 ||  || — || June 15, 2013 || Mount Lemmon || Mount Lemmon Survey ||  || align=right | 3.4 km || 
|-id=912 bgcolor=#d6d6d6
| 542912 ||  || — || July 16, 2013 || Haleakala || Pan-STARRS ||  || align=right | 2.9 km || 
|-id=913 bgcolor=#d6d6d6
| 542913 ||  || — || August 1, 2013 || Palomar || PTF || (8737) || align=right | 4.2 km || 
|-id=914 bgcolor=#d6d6d6
| 542914 ||  || — || August 2, 2013 || Haleakala || Pan-STARRS ||  || align=right | 2.6 km || 
|-id=915 bgcolor=#d6d6d6
| 542915 ||  || — || August 2, 2013 || Crni Vrh || J. Vales ||  || align=right | 3.1 km || 
|-id=916 bgcolor=#d6d6d6
| 542916 ||  || — || November 21, 2003 || Kitt Peak || Kitt Peak Obs. ||  || align=right | 4.3 km || 
|-id=917 bgcolor=#d6d6d6
| 542917 ||  || — || August 2, 2013 || Haleakala || Pan-STARRS ||  || align=right | 2.2 km || 
|-id=918 bgcolor=#d6d6d6
| 542918 ||  || — || May 14, 2012 || Haleakala || Pan-STARRS ||  || align=right | 3.2 km || 
|-id=919 bgcolor=#d6d6d6
| 542919 ||  || — || August 5, 2013 || Palomar || PTF ||  || align=right | 4.0 km || 
|-id=920 bgcolor=#d6d6d6
| 542920 ||  || — || August 5, 2013 || Elena Remote || A. Oreshko ||  || align=right | 2.9 km || 
|-id=921 bgcolor=#d6d6d6
| 542921 ||  || — || October 3, 2002 || Palomar || NEAT ||  || align=right | 2.5 km || 
|-id=922 bgcolor=#d6d6d6
| 542922 ||  || — || August 7, 2013 || Elena Remote || A. Oreshko ||  || align=right | 3.5 km || 
|-id=923 bgcolor=#d6d6d6
| 542923 ||  || — || September 27, 2003 || Kitt Peak || Spacewatch ||  || align=right | 2.1 km || 
|-id=924 bgcolor=#E9E9E9
| 542924 ||  || — || January 4, 2006 || Mount Lemmon || Mount Lemmon Survey ||  || align=right | 2.2 km || 
|-id=925 bgcolor=#d6d6d6
| 542925 ||  || — || October 5, 2008 || La Sagra || OAM Obs. ||  || align=right | 2.5 km || 
|-id=926 bgcolor=#d6d6d6
| 542926 Manteca ||  ||  || August 4, 2007 || Pla D'Arguines || R. Ferrando, M. Ferrando ||  || align=right | 2.9 km || 
|-id=927 bgcolor=#d6d6d6
| 542927 ||  || — || September 19, 2003 || Palomar || NEAT ||  || align=right | 3.5 km || 
|-id=928 bgcolor=#d6d6d6
| 542928 ||  || — || November 20, 2008 || Kitt Peak || Spacewatch ||  || align=right | 2.7 km || 
|-id=929 bgcolor=#d6d6d6
| 542929 ||  || — || July 15, 2013 || Haleakala || Pan-STARRS ||  || align=right | 2.6 km || 
|-id=930 bgcolor=#E9E9E9
| 542930 ||  || — || July 13, 2013 || Mount Lemmon || Mount Lemmon Survey ||  || align=right | 1.6 km || 
|-id=931 bgcolor=#fefefe
| 542931 ||  || — || August 26, 2005 || Palomar || NEAT || H || align=right data-sort-value="0.51" | 510 m || 
|-id=932 bgcolor=#E9E9E9
| 542932 ||  || — || December 6, 2005 || Kitt Peak || Spacewatch ||  || align=right | 2.2 km || 
|-id=933 bgcolor=#d6d6d6
| 542933 ||  || — || August 13, 2013 || Kitt Peak || Spacewatch ||  || align=right | 2.9 km || 
|-id=934 bgcolor=#d6d6d6
| 542934 ||  || — || March 8, 2006 || Kitt Peak || Spacewatch || Tj (2.98) || align=right | 4.3 km || 
|-id=935 bgcolor=#E9E9E9
| 542935 ||  || — || November 9, 2009 || Mount Lemmon || Mount Lemmon Survey ||  || align=right | 2.7 km || 
|-id=936 bgcolor=#d6d6d6
| 542936 ||  || — || July 16, 2013 || Haleakala || Pan-STARRS || EOS || align=right | 1.7 km || 
|-id=937 bgcolor=#d6d6d6
| 542937 ||  || — || June 20, 2013 || Haleakala || Pan-STARRS ||  || align=right | 2.7 km || 
|-id=938 bgcolor=#E9E9E9
| 542938 ||  || — || September 18, 2009 || Kitt Peak || Spacewatch ||  || align=right | 1.7 km || 
|-id=939 bgcolor=#E9E9E9
| 542939 ||  || — || August 15, 2013 || Haleakala || Pan-STARRS ||  || align=right | 1.7 km || 
|-id=940 bgcolor=#d6d6d6
| 542940 ||  || — || July 16, 2013 || Haleakala || Pan-STARRS ||  || align=right | 2.9 km || 
|-id=941 bgcolor=#fefefe
| 542941 ||  || — || February 21, 2007 || Catalina || CSS || H || align=right data-sort-value="0.65" | 650 m || 
|-id=942 bgcolor=#d6d6d6
| 542942 ||  || — || December 20, 2004 || Mount Lemmon || Mount Lemmon Survey ||  || align=right | 4.4 km || 
|-id=943 bgcolor=#fefefe
| 542943 ||  || — || August 12, 2013 || Haleakala || Pan-STARRS ||  || align=right data-sort-value="0.57" | 570 m || 
|-id=944 bgcolor=#d6d6d6
| 542944 ||  || — || July 16, 2013 || Haleakala || Pan-STARRS ||  || align=right | 2.5 km || 
|-id=945 bgcolor=#d6d6d6
| 542945 ||  || — || August 15, 2013 || Haleakala || Pan-STARRS ||  || align=right | 1.9 km || 
|-id=946 bgcolor=#d6d6d6
| 542946 ||  || — || May 19, 2012 || Mount Lemmon || Mount Lemmon Survey ||  || align=right | 2.8 km || 
|-id=947 bgcolor=#d6d6d6
| 542947 ||  || — || August 8, 2013 || Kitt Peak || Spacewatch ||  || align=right | 2.0 km || 
|-id=948 bgcolor=#d6d6d6
| 542948 ||  || — || August 15, 2013 || Haleakala || Pan-STARRS ||  || align=right | 1.9 km || 
|-id=949 bgcolor=#d6d6d6
| 542949 ||  || — || October 10, 2008 || Mount Lemmon || Mount Lemmon Survey ||  || align=right | 2.0 km || 
|-id=950 bgcolor=#d6d6d6
| 542950 ||  || — || August 8, 2013 || Kitt Peak || Spacewatch ||  || align=right | 1.9 km || 
|-id=951 bgcolor=#d6d6d6
| 542951 ||  || — || December 11, 2009 || Mount Lemmon || Mount Lemmon Survey ||  || align=right | 2.2 km || 
|-id=952 bgcolor=#d6d6d6
| 542952 ||  || — || October 24, 2008 || Kitt Peak || Spacewatch ||  || align=right | 1.8 km || 
|-id=953 bgcolor=#d6d6d6
| 542953 ||  || — || March 13, 2011 || Kitt Peak || Spacewatch ||  || align=right | 2.2 km || 
|-id=954 bgcolor=#d6d6d6
| 542954 ||  || — || August 9, 2013 || Kitt Peak || Spacewatch ||  || align=right | 2.3 km || 
|-id=955 bgcolor=#d6d6d6
| 542955 ||  || — || August 26, 2003 || Cerro Tololo || Cerro Tololo Obs. || KOR || align=right | 1.3 km || 
|-id=956 bgcolor=#d6d6d6
| 542956 ||  || — || August 12, 2013 || Kitt Peak || Spacewatch ||  || align=right | 2.8 km || 
|-id=957 bgcolor=#d6d6d6
| 542957 ||  || — || September 25, 2003 || Palomar || NEAT || EOS || align=right | 2.3 km || 
|-id=958 bgcolor=#fefefe
| 542958 ||  || — || August 18, 2013 || Haleakala || Pan-STARRS || H || align=right data-sort-value="0.50" | 500 m || 
|-id=959 bgcolor=#fefefe
| 542959 ||  || — || August 26, 2013 || Haleakala || Pan-STARRS || H || align=right data-sort-value="0.61" | 610 m || 
|-id=960 bgcolor=#fefefe
| 542960 ||  || — || December 30, 2011 || Catalina || CSS || H || align=right data-sort-value="0.46" | 460 m || 
|-id=961 bgcolor=#E9E9E9
| 542961 ||  || — || August 27, 2013 || Haleakala || Pan-STARRS ||  || align=right | 1.3 km || 
|-id=962 bgcolor=#d6d6d6
| 542962 ||  || — || August 26, 2013 || Haleakala || Pan-STARRS || 7:4 || align=right | 3.3 km || 
|-id=963 bgcolor=#d6d6d6
| 542963 ||  || — || August 28, 2013 || Haleakala || Pan-STARRS ||  || align=right | 2.6 km || 
|-id=964 bgcolor=#E9E9E9
| 542964 ||  || — || November 30, 2005 || Kitt Peak || Spacewatch ||  || align=right | 1.9 km || 
|-id=965 bgcolor=#d6d6d6
| 542965 ||  || — || August 26, 2013 || Haleakala || Pan-STARRS ||  || align=right | 2.9 km || 
|-id=966 bgcolor=#d6d6d6
| 542966 ||  || — || December 10, 2009 || Mount Lemmon || Mount Lemmon Survey ||  || align=right | 2.3 km || 
|-id=967 bgcolor=#E9E9E9
| 542967 ||  || — || September 21, 2009 || Mount Lemmon || Mount Lemmon Survey ||  || align=right | 2.1 km || 
|-id=968 bgcolor=#d6d6d6
| 542968 ||  || — || August 24, 2002 || Palomar || NEAT || TIR || align=right | 4.2 km || 
|-id=969 bgcolor=#d6d6d6
| 542969 ||  || — || August 26, 2013 || Haleakala || Pan-STARRS ||  || align=right | 2.4 km || 
|-id=970 bgcolor=#d6d6d6
| 542970 ||  || — || August 10, 2013 || Kitt Peak || Spacewatch ||  || align=right | 2.3 km || 
|-id=971 bgcolor=#d6d6d6
| 542971 ||  || — || October 2, 2002 || Haleakala || AMOS ||  || align=right | 3.6 km || 
|-id=972 bgcolor=#d6d6d6
| 542972 ||  || — || August 12, 2013 || Kitt Peak || Spacewatch ||  || align=right | 2.5 km || 
|-id=973 bgcolor=#d6d6d6
| 542973 ||  || — || September 29, 2008 || Catalina || CSS ||  || align=right | 2.4 km || 
|-id=974 bgcolor=#fefefe
| 542974 ||  || — || July 30, 2013 || Palomar || PTF || H || align=right data-sort-value="0.69" | 690 m || 
|-id=975 bgcolor=#d6d6d6
| 542975 ||  || — || June 22, 2007 || Mount Lemmon || Mount Lemmon Survey ||  || align=right | 2.9 km || 
|-id=976 bgcolor=#d6d6d6
| 542976 ||  || — || October 10, 2008 || Mount Lemmon || Mount Lemmon Survey ||  || align=right | 3.1 km || 
|-id=977 bgcolor=#d6d6d6
| 542977 ||  || — || August 17, 2013 || Haleakala || Pan-STARRS ||  || align=right | 2.7 km || 
|-id=978 bgcolor=#E9E9E9
| 542978 ||  || — || August 12, 2013 || Haleakala || Pan-STARRS ||  || align=right | 2.2 km || 
|-id=979 bgcolor=#d6d6d6
| 542979 ||  || — || September 11, 2002 || Palomar || NEAT ||  || align=right | 2.8 km || 
|-id=980 bgcolor=#d6d6d6
| 542980 ||  || — || January 15, 2010 || Mount Lemmon || Mount Lemmon Survey ||  || align=right | 4.1 km || 
|-id=981 bgcolor=#d6d6d6
| 542981 ||  || — || August 29, 2002 || Kitt Peak || Spacewatch ||  || align=right | 2.0 km || 
|-id=982 bgcolor=#d6d6d6
| 542982 ||  || — || August 31, 2013 || Crni Vrh || J. Skvarč ||  || align=right | 2.7 km || 
|-id=983 bgcolor=#d6d6d6
| 542983 ||  || — || September 6, 2008 || Mount Lemmon || Mount Lemmon Survey ||  || align=right | 1.8 km || 
|-id=984 bgcolor=#E9E9E9
| 542984 ||  || — || April 29, 2012 || Kitt Peak || Spacewatch ||  || align=right | 1.1 km || 
|-id=985 bgcolor=#E9E9E9
| 542985 ||  || — || August 15, 2013 || Haleakala || Pan-STARRS ||  || align=right | 2.1 km || 
|-id=986 bgcolor=#E9E9E9
| 542986 ||  || — || October 21, 2009 || Mount Lemmon || Mount Lemmon Survey ||  || align=right | 2.4 km || 
|-id=987 bgcolor=#d6d6d6
| 542987 ||  || — || August 14, 2013 || Haleakala || Pan-STARRS ||  || align=right | 3.0 km || 
|-id=988 bgcolor=#d6d6d6
| 542988 ||  || — || July 30, 2013 || Kitt Peak || Spacewatch ||  || align=right | 2.4 km || 
|-id=989 bgcolor=#d6d6d6
| 542989 ||  || — || October 20, 2008 || Kitt Peak || Spacewatch ||  || align=right | 2.6 km || 
|-id=990 bgcolor=#d6d6d6
| 542990 ||  || — || June 20, 2013 || Haleakala || Pan-STARRS ||  || align=right | 2.9 km || 
|-id=991 bgcolor=#d6d6d6
| 542991 ||  || — || August 29, 2002 || Palomar || NEAT ||  || align=right | 3.4 km || 
|-id=992 bgcolor=#fefefe
| 542992 ||  || — || February 13, 2012 || Haleakala || Pan-STARRS || H || align=right data-sort-value="0.45" | 450 m || 
|-id=993 bgcolor=#d6d6d6
| 542993 ||  || — || May 1, 2012 || Kitt Peak || Spacewatch ||  || align=right | 3.0 km || 
|-id=994 bgcolor=#d6d6d6
| 542994 ||  || — || September 5, 2008 || Kitt Peak || Spacewatch ||  || align=right | 2.2 km || 
|-id=995 bgcolor=#d6d6d6
| 542995 ||  || — || October 10, 2002 || Palomar || NEAT ||  || align=right | 3.6 km || 
|-id=996 bgcolor=#E9E9E9
| 542996 ||  || — || August 28, 2013 || Palomar || PTF || TIN || align=right | 1.7 km || 
|-id=997 bgcolor=#d6d6d6
| 542997 ||  || — || June 13, 2013 || Mount Lemmon || Mount Lemmon Survey ||  || align=right | 2.4 km || 
|-id=998 bgcolor=#d6d6d6
| 542998 ||  || — || September 11, 2002 || Palomar || NEAT ||  || align=right | 4.0 km || 
|-id=999 bgcolor=#E9E9E9
| 542999 ||  || — || August 15, 2013 || Haleakala || Pan-STARRS ||  || align=right | 1.6 km || 
|-id=000 bgcolor=#E9E9E9
| 543000 ||  || — || August 26, 2013 || Haleakala || Pan-STARRS ||  || align=right | 1.8 km || 
|}

References

External links 
 Discovery Circumstances: Numbered Minor Planets (540001)–(545000) (IAU Minor Planet Center)

0542